= Anil Arora =

Chief Statistician of Canada

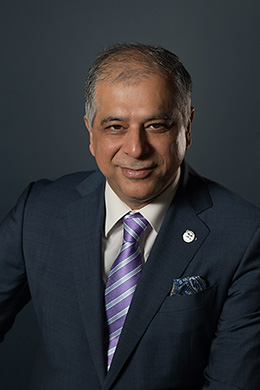

Chief Statistician of Canada
- In office September 19, 2016 – March 31, 2024
- Minister: Navdeep Bains; François-Philippe Champagne
- Preceded by: Wayne Smith
- Succeeded by: André Loranger (interim)

Personal details
- Education: University of Alberta (B.Sc.)
- Awards: Association of Professional Executives (APEX) Leadership Award (2009); National Association of Indo-Canadians Award (2009); Indo-Canada Ottawa Business Chamber Award of Excellence (2012); South Asian Centre Windsor Award (2017); Indo-Canada Chamber of Commerce, Professional of the Year Award (2017); Impacts Media (IMEC), Outstanding Contribution Award (2022); Metropolis Award of Excellence, Policy Maker Award (2022); Top 25 Canadian Immigrant Awards (2022); Environics Analytics Special Innovator of the Year Award (2023)
- Website: canada.ca/anil-arora

Anil Arora is a Canadian former civil servant who served as the 12th Chief Statistician of Canada from September 19, 2016 to March 31, 2024. Prior to his role as Chief Statistician, Arora served as Assistant Deputy Minister for Natural Resources Canada and Health Canada. He is also a public speaker, and has presented at conferences domestically and internationally.

== Early life ==
Arora was born in Dehradun, India. After his father was offered a job, the family immigrated to Canada, settling in Edmonton, Alberta. He graduated from the University of Alberta in 1985, and then worked in the petroleum industry, doing further studies in management and computer sciences. He joined Statistics Canada's regional operations in late 1988 and moved to Ottawa in 1997.

== Career ==
Arora began his career with Statistics Canada in Edmonton in 1988, where he looked after the mainframe computer and supervised data entry and clerical operations. He moved through the ranks working in regional operations, including census operations, corporate services, and the introduction of computer-assisted interviewing. After moving to Ottawa, he oversaw the redesign of CANSIM, a multi-dimensional time-series database. He also contributed to modernizing dissemination at the agency, including the provision of publications on the web and microdata in Canadian universities, and statistical products to support literacy in schools.

In 2000, he became director of census management, and subsequently, the director general responsible for the research functions of the 2001 census and the entirety of the 2006 census.

In 2005, Arora and his team were recognized by the GTEC Distinction Awards for their joint pilot project with Public Works and Government Services Canada to create Session Encryption with Automated Login (SEAL) technology, which allowed for the census questionnaire to be completed online. SEAL was first introduced in the 2004 Census Test.

In 2006, the Data Liberation Initiative awarded Arora and the Census Operations Division the organization's first Exemplary Access Award, in recognition for the division's transformation of census products (maps, tables and reference materials) into electronic products.

In 2008, he became the Assistant Chief Statistician of the Social, Health and Labour Statistics division, where he focused on redesigning the household surveys program. In 2009, Arora was awarded the Association of Professional Executives (APEX) Leadership Award. The same year, he completed the Public Sector Leadership and Governance certificate program at the University of Ottawa.

He remained in the post of Assistant Chief Statistician at Statistics Canada until 2010, when he became the Assistant Deputy Minister of the Minerals and Metals Sector at Natural Resources Canada, and for over a year simultaneously led the Corporate Sector as Assistant Deputy Minister. In 2013, he was appointed Assistant Deputy Minister of Science and Policy Integration.

In 2014, Arora moved into the role of Assistant Deputy Minister for Health Canada. He also served as the chair of the International Coalition for Medicines Regulatory Authority from 2014 to 2016, as well as chair of the Community of Federal Regulators.

=== Chief Statistician of Canada ===
Arora was appointed Chief Statistician of Canada in September 2016. He also oversaw Statistics Canada's shift towards user-centric service delivery, the use of administrative data, the AgZero project, and the virtual Data Lab. He played a significant role in implementing machine learning and artificial intelligence.

Arora led the implementation of the Disaggregated Data Action Plan, an approach aiming to produce more detailed statistical information for specific population groups, including women, LGBTQ2+, Indigenous peoples, and persons with disabilities. He also oversaw the creation of the Quality of Life Hub. In addition, a partnership with the Canadian Chamber of Commerce was established to develop the Business Data Lab under Arora's term. The Census of Environment was also initiated under his leadership, in partnership with Environment and Climate Change Canada.

During the COVID-19 pandemic, with increasing demand for data from Statistics Canada, Arora helped the agency assist governing health agencies with contact tracing across the country, and led the implementation of the 2021 census when it had to go contactless due to pandemic protocols.

The previous Chief Statistician, Wayne Smith, had stepped down to protest changes in Statistics Canada's informatics infrastructure stemming from the Shared Services Canada initiative, which he feared could compromise the agency's independence. During Arora's tenure, the Statistics Act saw modifications to increase the independence of the agency and create the Canadian Statistics Advisory Council.

Arora chaired the OECD Committee on Statistics and Statistical Policy (CSSP) from 2022 to 2023 and was vie-chair starting in 2017 of the Conference of European Statisticians. He also served as the vice-chair of the United Nations Statistical Commission from 2019 to 2021 and chaired the United Nations Future of Economic Statistics Group. In 2018, he became chair of the High-Level Group on the Modernization of Official Statistics, as well as the International Conference of Labour Statisticians for the International Labour Organization. He has consulted with the OECD, Eurostat, the World Bank, and the International Monetary Fund.

Arora has served on the boards of the Institute on Governance as well as the Labour Market Information Council, and as an advisor to a number of institutions, including Carleton University's Institute for Data Science. He has chaired and co-chaired initiatives including the Data Governance Standardization Collaborative and the Artificial Intelligence and Data Governance Standardization Collaborative. Arora also co-authored the Data Strategy for the Federal Public Service.

Arora has presented conferences both domestically and internationally, including the ISI World Statistics Congress, Empire Club of Canada, Canadian Club Toronto, Metropolis Canada Conference, Safety of Our Cities Conference, International Association of Privacy Professionals Canada Privacy Symposium, Government of Canada data conferences, and Cabinet of Canada meetings. In 2023, he delivered the Canada School of Public Service's Manion Lecture at the National Arts Centre in Ottawa. He has delivered guest lectures at universities and colleges including Queen's University at Kingston, the University of Alberta, Simon Fraser University, Nunavut Arctic College, the University of Saskatchewan, Carleton University, and the University of Ottawa.

On June 14, 2023, Arora was reappointed as Chief Statistician until March 31, 2024.

== Selected publications ==
- "Canadian Identity–Past, present and future." Canadian Issues (2023): 2–7. With Maire Sinha and Sharanjit Uppal.
- "Now more than ever, the world needs data stewards." Centre for International Governance Innovation (October 1, 2020). With Rohinton P. Medhora.
- "Modernizing the national statistical system: Stakeholder consultations." Statistics Canada (June 2018). ISBN 9780660315805.
- “Statistics Canada – Census on the Net.” Statistical Journal of the UN Economic Commission for Europe 23, no. 1 (July 12, 2006): 11–22. With Graeme Gilmour. doi:10.3233/SJU-2006-23102.
- "2006 Census of Canada: Strategic direction and issues." Statistics Canada International Symposium Series - Proceedings (2003).

== General references ==
- "Anil Arora". Prime Minister of Canada. 2016-09-16.
- Schwartz, Zane. "Measuring Canada: In conversation with Canada's chief statistician, Anil Arora". The Logic. 2018-11-05.
- Hemmadi, Murad. "Measuring the pandemic: How Statistics Canada kept the data flowing amid COVID-19". The Logic. 2020-09-11.
