= 2011 Canadian census =

2011 enumeration of the Canadian population

- May 10, 2011

General information
- Country: Canada

Results
- Total population: 33,476,688 (▲5.9%)
- Most populous province/territory: Ontario (12,851,821)
- Least populous province/territory: Nunavut (31,906)

The 2011 Canadian census was a detailed enumeration of the Canadian population on May 10, 2011. Statistics Canada, an agency of the Canadian government, conducts a nationwide census every five years. In 2011, it consisted of a mandatory short form census questionnaire and an inaugural National Household Survey (NHS), a voluntary survey which replaced the mandatory long form census questionnaire; this substitution was the focus of much controversy. Completion of the (short form) census is mandatory for all Canadians, and those who do not complete it may face penalties ranging from fines to prison sentences.

The Statistics Act mandates a Senate and/or House of Commons (joint) committee review of the opt-in clause (for the release of one's census records after 92 years) by 2014.

The 2011 census was the fifteenth decennial census and, like other censuses, was required by section 8 of the Constitution Act, 1867. As with other decennial censuses, the data was used to adjust federal electoral district boundaries.

As of August 24, 2011, Canada's overall collection response rate was 98.1%, up over a percentage point from 96.5% in the 2006 census. Ontario and Prince Edward Island each held the highest response rate at 98.3%, while Nunavut held the lowest response rate at 92.7%.

In an article in the New York Times in August 2015, journalist Stephen Marche argued that by ending the mandatory long-form census in 2011, the federal government "stripped Canada of its capacity to gather information about itself" in the "age of information." Nearly 500 organizations in Canada, including the Canadian Medical Association, the Canadian Chamber of Commerce, the Canadian Federation of Students, and the Canadian Catholic Council of Bishops protested the decision to replace the long form census in 2011 with a shorter version.

== Questionnaire revision ==
=== Short form ===
The original schedule of the short-form questions for the 2011 Census of Population was published in the Canada Gazette, Part I on August 21, 2010. The 2011 census consisted of the same eight questions that appeared on the 2006 census short-form questionnaire, with the addition of two questions on language. The federal Minister of Industry Tony Clement's announcement that questions about language would appear on the mandatory short-form census came in response to a lawsuit brought by the Federation of Francophone and Acadian Communities, which claimed that the voluntary status of the long-form census would impact language-related government services.

In addition to possible questions on activity limitation, various organizations called for the following changes to the 2011 census:

- Adding "Aboriginal identifier" to the short form (already found on the long form).
- Relationship of same-sex married couples.
- Place of work and transportation-related questions.
- Food security questions.

=== National Household Survey ===
The National Household Survey (NHS) began within four weeks of the May 2011 census and included approximately 4.5 million households. The information collected by the NHS was intended to replace the data from the previous long-form census questionnaire.

Various industry professionals indicated that the data collected by the NHS is not comparable with the data previously collected by the long form questionnaire. Many of the same professionals indicated that the data gathered by a voluntary survey would not be of the same quality as the previous mandatory long form.

== Voluntary long-form survey controversy ==
Ahead of the 2011 census, the Conservative government announced that the long-form questionnaire would no longer be mandatory. This decision was made by the June 17, 2010 Order in Council, created by the Minister of Industry, defining the questions for the 2011 census as including only the short-form questions. This was published in the Canada Gazette on June 26, 2010; however, a news release was not issued by Minister of Industry Tony Clement until July 13, 2010. This release stated in part "The government will retain the mandatory short form that will collect basic demographic information. To meet the need for additional information, and to respect the privacy wishes of Canadians, the government has introduced the voluntary National Household Survey." On July 30, 2010, Statistics Canada published a description of the National Household Survey, intended to be sent to about 4.5 million households. Industry minister Tony Clement stated that the change to voluntary forms was made because of privacy-related complaints, though he acknowledged that the decision was made without consulting organizations and governments that work closely with Statistics Canada. Clement had previously said that this change was made on the advice of Statistics Canada.

The move was criticized by a number of organizations and individuals and was the subject of some satirical articles. Ivan Fellegi, the former Chief Statistician of Canada, originally appointed in 1985 by the Progressive Conservative government of Brian Mulroney, said that he would have quit his job if the government had taken this change during his tenure. He claims that those who are most vulnerable (such as the poor, new immigrants, and Aboriginal peoples) are least likely to respond to a voluntary form, which weakens information about those demographic groups. Munir Sheikh, Fellegi's successor as Chief Statistician appointed by Conservative Prime Minister Stephen Harper on February 15, 2008, resigned on July 21, 2010, in protest of the Conservative government's change in policy. In a public letter, Sheikh wrote that he could not legally comment on what advice he had given the government regarding the census, but he did comment against the government's decision, writing:

I want to take this opportunity to comment on a technical statistical issue which has become the subject of media discussion. This relates to the question of whether a voluntary survey can become a substitute for a mandatory census. It cannot.

The National Citizens Coalition and the Fraser Institute supported the change.

There were groups against the change from all parts of the political spectrum, and including the Federation of Canadian Municipalities; Atlantic Provinces Economic Council; City of Toronto government; National Statistics Council; Canadian Jewish Congress; Evangelical Fellowship of Canada; Canadian Conference of Catholic Bishops; Canadian Medical Association; Statistical Society of Canada; the American Statistical Association; Registered Nurses Association of Ontario; Canadian Conference of the Arts; and the governments of Ontario, Quebec, New Brunswick, Prince Edward Island, and Manitoba.

On July 19, 2010, representatives from several institutions signed a letter expressing their disapproval of the change and their desire to speak to Clement to find another solution. The organizations represented were:

- Canadian Association for Business Economics
- Canadian Nurses Association
- Caledon Institute of Social Policy
- Canadian Institute of Planners
- Institute for Research on Public Policy
- Ontario Council of Agencies Serving Immigrants
- Co-operative Housing Federation of Canada
- Canadian Labour Congress
- Canada West Foundation
- United Way of Canada
- Glendon School of Public and International Affairs
- National Specialty Society for Community Medicine
- Environics Analytics
- The University of Toronto School of Public Policy and Governance and Rotman School of Management
- Nanos Research
- Canadian Public Health Association
- Canadian Association of University Teachers
- Canadian Council on Social Development
- Canadian Economic Association
- Toronto Board of Trade

A House of Commons industry committee special hearing on July 27, 2010, heard that during the previous census, out of approximately 12 million forms, 166 complaints were known to be received directly or indirectly. In answer to Clement's claim that those who do not fill out the census risk jail time, Jack Layton, leader of the national New Democratic Party, noted that in the entire history of the census, the government had not prosecuted and jailed a single person for failing to complete the census, and pointed out that the threat could be removed entirely by amending the legislation so that incarceration is no longer a penalty for refusal to complete the census. In response, the government announced plans to introduce legislation to remove the threat of jail time for anyone refusing to fill out any mandatory government surveys.

Some groups have argued that the decision was motivated by a wish to destroy a useful tool for social advocacy, by making it harder to identify and count disadvantaged groups. However, the Conservative government maintains that its reasoning for the cancellation is that they do not believe it is appropriate to force Canadians to divulge detailed personal information under threat of prosecution.

On October 20, 2010, Statistics Canada predicted that a voluntary long-form would result in a decline of total respondents from 94% to 50%. Consequently, they expect a "substantial risk of non-response bias" and plan to "[adapt their] data collection and other procedures to mitigate as much as possible against these risks." The response rate also led them to predict an increased risk of sampling errors, because only 16% of the Canadian population would be surveyed, as opposed to 19% under a mandatory long-form similar to the one in 2006. The government announced in August 2010 that it would spend$30 million on a campaign aimed at increasing the response rate to the voluntary form, but information released by Statistics Canada in December 2010 revealed that half of this money would be required for tasks unrelated to the promotional campaign.

Criticism of the National Household Survey re-emerged in 2013 following the release of the first set of results from the survey.

== Reforms since 2011 ==
=== Private member's bill ===
In September 2014, Liberal MP Ted Hsu introduced private member's bill "Bill C-626, An Act to amend the Statistics Act" with the intention of appointing a Chief Statistician and reinstatement of the long-form census in Canada. Despite wide support, this failed at Second Reading in February 2015, as is common for private members' bills.

=== 2016 amendments ===
Following the election of the Liberal government of Justin Trudeau, the Minister of Innovation, Science and Economic Development introduced in the House of Commons Bill C-36, An Act to Amend the Statistics Act on December 7, 2016. The amendments were passed by Royal Assent on December 13, 2017. The Government of Canada press release stated that the amendments were made to the Statistics Act to "ensure that decisions on statistical matters are transparent and are based on professional considerations."

=== 2015 reinstatement of Mandatory Long Form Census ===
One day after its election in November 2015, the new Liberal government reinstated the mandatory census long form and it was used in the 2016 census.

== Data releases ==
Census of Population

The results of short form were released among five census topics on the following dates in 2012:

- Population and dwelling counts – February 8, 2012;
- Age and sex – May 29, 2012;
- Families, households and marital status – September 19, 2012;
- Structural type of dwelling and collectives – September 19, 2012; and
- Language – October 24, 2012.

Census of Agriculture

Farm and farm operator data from the Census of Agriculture was released on May 10, 2012.

National Household Survey (NHS)

The release dates of the five NHS topics occur on the following dates in 2013:

- Aboriginal peoples – May 8, 2013;
- Immigration and ethnocultural diversity – May 8, 2013;
- Education and labour – June 26, 2013;
- Mobility and migration – June 26, 2013; and
- Income and housing – August 14, 2013.

== Population and dwellings ==
Rank	Province or territory	Population as of 2011 census	Population as of 2006 census	Change	Percent change
1	Ontario	12,851,821	12,160,282	691,539 ▲	5.7 ▲
2	Quebec	7,903,001	7,546,131	356,870 ▲	4.7 ▲
3	British Columbia	4,400,057	4,113,487	286,570 ▲	7.0 ▲
4	Alberta	3,645,257	3,290,350	354,907 ▲	10.8 ▲
5	Manitoba	1,208,268	1,148,401	59,867 ▲	5.2 ▲
6	Saskatchewan	1,033,381	968,157	65,224 ▲	6.7 ▲
7	Nova Scotia	921,727	913,462	8,265 ▲	0.9 ▲
8	New Brunswick	751,171	729,997	21,174 ▲	2.9 ▲
9	Newfoundland and Labrador	514,536	505,469	9,067 ▲	1.8 ▲
10	Prince Edward Island	140,204	135,851	4,353 ▲	3.2 ▲
11	Northwest Territories	41,462	41,464	−2 ▼	0.0 ▼
12	Yukon	33,897	30,372	3,525 ▲	11.6 ▲
13	Nunavut	31,906	29,474	2,432 ▲	8.3 ▲
	Canada	33,476,688	31,612,897	1,863,791 ▲	5.9 ▲

== See also ==
- Demographics of Canada
- Statistics Act
- Elections Canada
- Population and housing censuses by country
