= Vidyadhar P. Godambe =

Indian statistician

- Born: 1 June 1926; Pune, India
- Died: 9 June 2016 (aged 90)
- Known for: survey sampling estimating equations

Academic background
- Education: B.Sc., Fergusson College; M.Sc., Statistics, 1950, Bombay University; PhD., 1958, University of London
- Thesis: Robust and non-parametric inference and other general criteria for statistical decisions (1958)
- Doctoral advisor: George Alfred Barnard

Academic work
- Institutions: Dominion Bureau of Statistics; Rashtrasant Tukadoji Maharaj Nagpur University; Bombay University; Johns Hopkins University; University of Michigan; University of Waterloo

Vidyadhar Prabhakar Godambe FRSC (1 June 1926 – 9 June 2016) was an Indian statistician. He was a Distinguished Professor Emeritus at the University of Waterloo. Godambe was known for formulating and developing a theory of estimating equations.

== Early life and education ==
Godambe was born on 1 June 1926, in Pune, India, as the second oldest of four children. He was frail and sickly growing up, so he attended the local school from age five to 10. Godambe later attended Nutan Marathi Vidyalaya in Pune and Fergusson College for his Bachelor of Science in mathematics.

After earning his master's degree, Godambe accepted a position in the Bureau of Economics and Statistics with the Government of Bombay. While there, he submitted papers for publication in the Journal of the Royal Statistical Society and Bulletin of the Bureau of Economics and Statistics, Bombay. Godambe shortly thereafter left Bombay to pursue a PhD at the University of London, and accepted a fellowship at the University of California, Berkeley. Upon his return, and completion of his thesis, Godambe was appointed a senior research fellow at the Indian Statistical Institute and professor and head of the Statistics Department in Nagpur.

== Career ==
Godambe eventually left Nagpur and accepted a position at Bombay University as a professor for one year. He then moved to North America and worked at the Dominion Bureau of Statistics, alongside Ivan Fellegi, then taught at Johns Hopkins University, University of Michigan, and finally the University of Waterloo. Godambe began his career at the University of Waterloo in July 1967 as a visiting professor in Statistics and Actuarial Sciences but was granted tenure as Professor in July 1969. A few years later, in 1971, Godambe and Mary Thompson read a paper to the Royal Statistical Society entitled ‘Bayes, fiducial, and frequency aspects of statistical inference in survey sampling.

From there, "Godambe’s paradox" was invented. Based on the paper published in the Journal of the Royal Statistical Society, he demonstrated that the likelihood principle implies that inference should be independent of the sampling design in general, which led to the development of model theory in survey sampling. His method of estimating equations argued that all statistical inferences should adhere to his "ancillarity principle."

== Awards and honours ==
In 1987, Godambe was honoured with the Statistical Society of Canada (SSC) Gold Medal and was later named an honorary member. In 1991, he was appointed a Distinguished Professor Emeritus at the University of Waterloo. In 2002, Godambe was elected a Fellow of the Royal Society of Canada.
