= Canadian Census of Agriculture =

Canadian Census of Agriculture Recensement de l'agriculture
- Genre: Census
- Frequency: Quinquenial
- Country: Canada
- Inaugurated: 1896 (Manitoba); 1906 (Alberta, Saskatchewan); 1956 (Canada) 1896; 130 years ago
- Most recent: 2021
- Organiser: Statistics Canada
- Website: www.statcan.gc.ca/en/census-agriculture?MM=1

The Canadian Census of Agriculture (CEAG) (French: Recensement de l'agriculture (REAG)) is a census conducted every five years by Statistics Canada, alongside the Census of Population, for the purpose of creating, "a comprehensive profile of the physical, economic, social and environmental characteristics of Canada's agriculture industry."

== Overview ==
A Census of Agriculture is mandated by the Statistics Act to be completed every five years. As such, Statistics Canada surveys every agricultural operation and agricultural operator in Canada.

For the purpose of the 2021 CEAG, an agricultural operator was defined as "a person responsible for the management and/or financial decisions made in the production of agricultural commodities," while agricultural operation was defined as "a farm or agricultural holding that produces agricultural products and reports revenues or expenses for tax purposes to the Canada Revenue Agency." These definitions were updated for 2021 collection.

The Census of Agriculture is conducted concurrently with the larger Census of Population. Doing so allows for savings within the administrative costs, as well as for a direct linkage with the socio-demographic results present in the Census of Population, which is used to further inform the results of the Census of Agriculture. This linkage has been running since 1971.

The most recent Census of Agriculture in Canada was conducted in May 2021.

== History ==
1911 Census of Canada, volume IV - Agriculture

Following after the designation of the national census in the Constitution Act, 1867, the first Census of Agriculture was conducted in Manitoba in 1896, with Alberta and Saskatchewan being added in 1901. In 1956 the Census of Agriculture was expanded to the rest of Canada, and at the same time would begin to be conducted concurrently to the Census of Population.

Like the Census of Population, the Census of Agriculture shifted from the responsibility of the Ministry of Agriculture to the Ministry of Trade and Commerce in 1912, and finally to the Dominion Bureau of Statistics (presently Statistics Canada) in 1918.

== Data collected from Census of Agriculture ==
The Census of Agriculture, given its interests in presenting a thorough understanding of the entirety of the agricultural sector in Canada, collects a wide variety of data about agricultural operations and operators. Examples of data collected include:

Agricultural Operator Data:

- Number of Operators
- Age of Operators
- Gender of Operators
- Education of Operators
- Responsibilities of Operators

Agricultural Operation Data:

- Type of operating arrangements
- Main farm location
- Size (area) of operation
- Land use and land tenure
- Area and type of crops
- Number and type of livestock
- Land management practices
- Market value of land and buildings
- Number and market value of farm machinery by type
- Total gross farm receipts
- Total farm business operating expenses
- Total number of employees and number of employees paid on a full, part-time or seasonal basis
- Presence of Direct marketing
- Succession planning
- Presence of Renewable energy producing systems.

The Census of Agriculture includes producers of both traditional agricultural products as well as other, more exotic to Canada products. Special categorization is given to operations in the territories, including the herding of wild animals, breeding of sled dogs, and harvesting of indigenous plants and berries.

Data collected under the Census of Agriculture is protected under the Statistics Act, to ensure that all information provided during the census remains confidential. Like the Census of Population, data is held confidentially and anonymized as necessary.

== 2021 Census of Agriculture ==
The most recent Census of Agriculture, collected in 2021, featured 73 content questions plus 4 screening and identification questions. Add offered the option for respondents to complete their questionnaire online.

While each iteration of the CEAG introduces changes to the questionnaire and the use of new technologies or methods, some notable changes implemented for this cycle include:

- new conceptual definition of a “farm” or “agricultural holding”
- the increased use of data integration
- a new data processing environment
- a new disclosure avoidance method
- the release of quality indicators for published estimates

Statistics Canada has published several infographics featuring some key findings from the collection of the 2021 CEAG, including socioeconomic, education, and immigration data related to Canada's agricultural operations and their operators.

The 2021 Census of Agriculture recorded 189,874 farms, a 1.9% decline compared to 2016's CEAG.

== 2016 Census of Agriculture ==
2016's Census of Agriculture included a questionnaire containing 183 questions, spanning 16 pages. However respondents were only required to answer questions applying to their agricultural operations. Questions on four new topics were added to the 2016 Census of Agriculture, including adoption of technologies, direct marketing, succession planning and renewable energy systems. There were several types of data collected to assess information on current agriculture, as an important commodity in the Canadian economy.

The 2016 Census of Agriculture recorded 193,492 farms and 271,935 farm operators.

== Census publication and use ==
Statistics Canada provides the data to government and public entities at various levels to inform agricultural policy, as well as to establish benchmarks of crops, livestock, and farm finances. The statistical sets, as well as analysis by Statistics Canada is published in the years following a Census of Agriculture.

The Census of Agriculture has been useful in many scientific studies, including a study on land use for agriculture in Canada. It has also been used in the past to gauge the effects of climate change within the prairie provinces of Canada.

== See also ==
- Census in Canada
- Agriculture in Canada
- Economy of Canada
- Statistics Act
