= Shared Services Canada =

Government information technology agency

- Services partagés Canada

Agency overview
- Formed: 2011
- Type: Agency responsible for IT Service Delivery across Government Departments.
- Employees: 8,995
- Minister responsible: Joël Lightbound, Minister of Government Transformation, Public Services and Procurement
- Agency executive: Patrick Pichette, President, Shared Services Canada, styled as CEO, Digital Transformation Canada
- Website: www.canada.ca/en/shared-services.html

Shared Services Canada (SSC; French: Services partagés Canada (SPC)) is an agency of the Government of Canada responsible for providing information technology services across federal government departments. It was established in 2011 to combine digital services such as data storage that were previously duplicated by each agency.

In September 2026, the Government of Canada announced that SSC will be combined with portions of the Treasury Board Secretariat, Public Services and Procurement Canada, and the Canadian Digital Service (formerly under Employment and Social Development Canada) to form Digital Transformation Canada.

== Mandate ==
SSC's mandate came into force 4 August 2011 as part of the passage of the Shared Services Canada Act, which established SSC as an agency responsible for consolidating information technology (IT) systems across the federal government. The Act provides for a minister to oversee the agency and report to Parliament, currently Joël Lightbound, the Minister of Government Transformation, Public Services and Procurement.

SSC provides support for 45 departments and agencies across the Government of Canada.

== Key initiatives ==
As part of SSC's mandate, a number of key projects were identified to consolidate and modernize the federal government's IT infrastructure:

=== Email Transformation Initiative ===
SSC is working to consolidate the email systems of its partner agencies which include over 550,000 mailboxes into a single system. The project has been met with multiple delays due to its large scope and complexity.

=== Data Centre Consolidation ===
SSC began the process of consolidating the Canadian Federal Government's approximately 800 Data Centres down to 7 newly designed Enterprise Data Centres (EDC). As of April 1, 2017, SSC has closed 92 data centers across the country and had begun to migrate applications to new EDCs located in:

- Borden, ON
- Barrie, ON
- Gatineau, QC
- Montreal, QC

SSC estimates that current legacy systems comprise over 56,000 m^{2} of Data Centre space, over 70 PB of computer data storage and over 14,000 applications.

=== Telecommunications Transformation Program ===
SSC is working to consolidate Canadian Federal Government Networks down from 50 separate Wide Area Networks (WAN) down to a single network for all departments. Another initiative is to consolidate Centrex phone lines through the use of VoIP and Mobile Phones. On 5 October 2017, SSC signed a $176M CAD contract with Telus to consolidate over 80,000 phone lines and expand desktop video conferencing and instant messaging.

== Criticism ==
SSC has been criticized for slow service delivery and for putting the mandates of key federal agencies at risk due to poor support. Former RCMP Commissioner Bob Paulson criticized SSC for outages including access to key databases such as CPIC and for outages of the Agency's BlackBerry service.

In August 2016, Chief Statistician of Canada Wayne Smith resigned to protest the effects of Shared Services Canada on Statistics Canada.
