= 2021 Canadian census =

Detailed enumeration of Canadian residents in 2021

- May 11, 2021
- Statistics Canada's visual identifier for its 2021 Census of Population

General information
- Country: Canada
- Authority: Statistics Canada
- Website: statcan.gc.ca/census

Results
- Total population: 36,991,981 (▲5.2%)
- Most populous province/territory: Ontario (14,223,942)
- Least populous province/territory: Nunavut (36,858)
- Citizens (both by birth and naturalization): 33.1 million
- Non-citizens — permanent residents and non-permanent residents (who have a work or study permit or who have claimed refugee status): 3.2 million

In 2021, Canada conducted a national census with a reference date of May 11, 2021. It recorded a total national population of 36,991,981 – a 5.2% increase over the five years from the 2016 Canadian census, which recorded a population of 35,151,728. The overall response rate in 2021 was 98%, slightly lower than the response rate for the 2016 census. This census was succeeded by Canada's 2026 census.

== Planning ==
Consultation on census program content was from September 11 to December 8, 2017. The census was conducted by Statistics Canada, and was contactless as a result of the COVID-19 pandemic in Canada. The agency had considered delaying the census until 2022.

About 900 supervisors and 31,000 field enumerators were hired to conduct the door-to-door survey of individuals and households who had not completed the census questionnaire by late May or early June. Canvassing agents wore masks and maintained a physical distance to comply with COVID-19 safety regulations.

== Questionnaire ==
In early May 2021, Statistics Canada began sending mailings to households throughout Canada containing instructions for completing the census questionnaire. The questionnaires could be completed by returning the paper questionnaire, or by phone or online by using an access code provided in the mailing. Statistics Canada expected about 80% of households to complete the questionnaire online. It was also available in large-print, braille, audio, and video formats. The questionnaire questions were available in a number of languages (Arabic, simplified and traditional Chinese, Italian, Korean, Persian, Portuguese, Punjabi, Russian, Spanish, Urdu, and Vietnamese) and Indigenous languages (Atikamekw, Denesuline, Nunavik and Nunavut Inuktitut, Mohawk, Montagnais, Naskapi, Northern Quebec Cree, Ojibwe, Oji-Cree, Plains Cree, Swampy Cree, and Tłı̨chǫ), but the questionnaire had to be completed in either English or French.

The questionnaire came in two formats: short-form and long-form. The standard, short-form questionnaire was to be completed by 75% of households; it collected data on age, languages spoken, marital status, religious affiliation and other basic data about the household. The remaining 25% of households completed a long-form questionnaire: this collected more extensive information about the household's economic and social state, information about the occupied dwelling, and other more detailed information (in addition to the basic data collected in the short-form questionnaire).

Those who completed a census questionnaire online could listen to a number of soundtracks on Spotify and YouTube prepared by Statistics Canada.

Completing the questionnaire was at the time of the 2021 census, and remains, a legal requirement. Refusal to complete a questionnaire exposes a person to a fine of up to $500. It must be completed by Canadian citizens, permanent residents, refugee claimants, and those with a study or work permit.

== Data release schedule ==
Data from the 2021 census was released over the course of 2022, organised by topic/theme:

- February 9, 2022, for population and dwelling counts;
- April 27, 2022, for age, sex at birth, gender, and type of dwelling;
- July 13, 2022, for families, households, and marital status, Canadian military experience, and income;
- August 17, 2022, for languages;
- September 21, 2022, for Indigenous peoples, and housing;
- October 26, 2022, for immigration, place of birth, and citizenship, ethnocultural and religious diversity, and mobility and migration;
- November 30, 2022, for education, labour, language of work, commuting, and instruction in the official minority language.

== Data ==
Statistics Canada links income and related information obtained from the Canada Revenue Agency, and immigration status data obtained from Immigration, Refugees and Citizenship Canada, to the census responses.

The 2021 Canadian census included new questions "critical to measuring equity, diversity and inclusivity". For the first time, questions were asked about commuting methods, and the census asked new questions designed to better count transgender people and people of non-binary gender. Canada is thus the "first country to collect and publish data on gender diversity from a national census".

== Results ==
The 2021 census recorded a total federal population of 36,991,981, living in 14,978,941 of Canada's total 16,284,235 dwellings. With a land area of 8,788,702.80 km^{2} (3,393,337.12 sq mi), Canada's population density was thus 4.21/km^{2} (10.90/sq mi). Canada's most- and least-populated provinces were Ontario and Prince Edward Island, respectively. Amongst the three territories, the Northwest Territories was the largest in terms of population, while Nunavut once again became the smallest territory after briefly overtaking Yukon in 2016.

The total national population of Canada rose by 5.2 per cent since the 2016 census, which had recorded a national population of 35,151,728. Three provinces' and one territory's population grew faster than Canada's overall population increase: Prince Edward Island – an 8 per cent increase, British Columbia – a 7.6 per cent increase, and Ontario – a 5.8 per cent increase; and Yukon – a 12.1 per cent increase. The rapid growth in Yukon is largely credited to immigration and to migration from other parts of Canada. At the other end of the spectrum, only one province and one territory saw a decrease in population since 2016: Newfoundland and Labrador – a 1.8 per cent decrease, and the Northwest Territories — a 1.7 per cent decrease.

The majority of Canadians identified their sex at birth as female (50.73%), while 49.27% of the population identified their birth sex as male. The median age overall was 41.6 years – 42.8 years for females and 40.4 years for males.

The 2021 census data showed 0.33% (100,815, or approximately 1 in 300) of the Canadian population aged 15 years and older (total nearly 30.5m) identified their gender as either transgender (59,460) or as non-binary (41,355).

=== Population ===
Province or territory	Population as of 2021 census	Population as of 2016 census	Change	Percent change
Ontario	14,223,942	13,448,494	775,448 ▲	5.8 ▲
Quebec	8,501,833	8,164,361	337,472 ▲	4.1 ▲
British Columbia	5,000,879	4,648,055	352,824 ▲	7.6 ▲
Alberta	4,262,635	4,067,175	195,460 ▲	4.8 ▲
Manitoba	1,342,153	1,278,365	63,788 ▲	5.0 ▲
Saskatchewan	1,132,505	1,098,352	34,153 ▲	3.1 ▲
Nova Scotia	969,383	923,598	45,785 ▲	5.0 ▲
New Brunswick	775,610	747,101	28,509 ▲	3.8 ▲
Newfoundland and Labrador	510,550	519,716	−9,166 ▼	−1.8 ▼
Prince Edward Island	154,331	142,907	11,424 ▲	8.0 ▲
Northwest Territories	41,070	41,786	−716 ▼	−1.7 ▼
Yukon	40,232	35,874	4,358 ▲	12.1 ▲
Nunavut	36,858	35,944	914 ▲	2.5 ▲
Canada	36,991,981	35,151,728	1,840,253 ▲	5.2 ▲

=== Age, sex at birth, and gender ===
Province or Territory	Age			Gender		Sex at birth (Note: Statistics Canada did not allow, on the census questionnaire (though it appears to in other 'variant classifications' used in other data collections), the answer 'intersex' or any other sex other than man or woman. It says it does this because of the small numbers of intersex people and because of other 'difficulties': see further https://egale.ca/wp-content/uploads/2022/10/Brief-on-Statistics-Canada-Sex-and-Gender-Data%E2%80%93Census-2021.pdf, which notes mixed characteristics or intersex assignment at birth could be as much as 1-4%, depending on the population surveyed.)	
Province or Territory	0–14	15–64	65+	Men+ (Note: The "Men+" category includes men and boys, as well as some non-binary persons.)	Women+ (Note: The "Women+" category includes women and girls, as well as some non-binary persons.)	Male	Female
Alberta	809,640	2,823,771	629,225	2,127,935	2,134,700	2,126,925	2,135,710
British Columbia	716,900	3,267,615	1,016,360	2,457,515	2,543,365	2,456,420	2,544,455
Manitoba	252,935	860,165	229,050	666,495	675,660	666,000	676,155
New Brunswick	111,130	487,320	177,160	381,460	394,150	381,260	394,350
Newfoundland and Labrador	68,190	321,750	120,610	250,075	260,475	249,985	260,560
Northwest Territories	8,475	28,485	4,105	20,845	20,225	20,845	20,220
Nova Scotia	136,710	617,345	215,325	471,735	497,650	471,180	498,200
Nunavut	12,085	23,170	1,605	18,765	18,095	18,755	18,105
Ontario	2,251,795	9,334,440	2,637,710	6,970,850	7,253,090	6,968,425	7,255,515
Prince Edward Island	23,640	97,985	32,710	75,385	78,945	75,370	78,965
Quebec	1,391,360	5,356,940	1,753,530	4,201,960	4,299,875	4,201,360	4,300,475
Saskatchewan	223,110	711,410	197,985	563,125	569,380	562,905	569,600
Yukon	6,825	27,360	6,050	20,105	20,130	20,085	20,150
Canada	6,012,795	23,957,755	7,021,430	18,226,240	18,765,745	18,219,520	18,772,465
Source: Statistics Canada

=== Ethnic origins ===
Group	Population	% of total population
Not a visible minority	26,689,275	73.4
White	24,493,090	67.4
Indigenous	2,196,185	6.0
Visible minority	9,639,205	26.6
South Asian	2,571,400	7.1
Chinese	1,715,770	4.7
Black	1,547,870	4.3
Filipino	957,355	2.6
Arab	694,015	1.9
Latin American	580,235	1.6
Southeast Asian	390,340	1.1
West Asian	360,495	1.0
Korean	218,140	0.6
Japanese	98,890	0.3
Multiple visible minorities	331,805	0.9
Visible minority, n.i.e.	172,885	0.5
Total	36,328,480	100.0
Source: Statistics Canada

== See also ==
- Demographics of Canada
- Statistics Act
- 2022 Canadian federal electoral redistribution
- Population and housing censuses by country
