= Duffett =

Duffett is a surname. Notable people with the surname include:

- Nicola Duffett (born 1963), English actress
- Rick Duffett (born 1946), Canadian ice hockey player and coach
- Thomas Duffett (or Thomas Duffet), 17th-century Irish playwright and songwriter in England
- Walter E. Duffett (1910–1982), Canadian statistician and civil servant

== See also ==
- Buffett
