= IOG =

IOG may refer to:

- Institute on Governance, a Canadian think tank
- Ismaïl Omar Guelleh (born 1947), 2nd President of Djibouti
- 318th Information Operations Group, a unit of the US Air Force
