= National Statistics Council =

Canadian government agency

The National Statistics Council is a Canadian government agency which advises the Chief Statistician of Canada on Statistics Canada’s activities, primarily on program priorities.

The NSC drew media attention as a result of its objection to the removal of the long-form census deployed in the 2011 Census.
