= Archibald Blue =

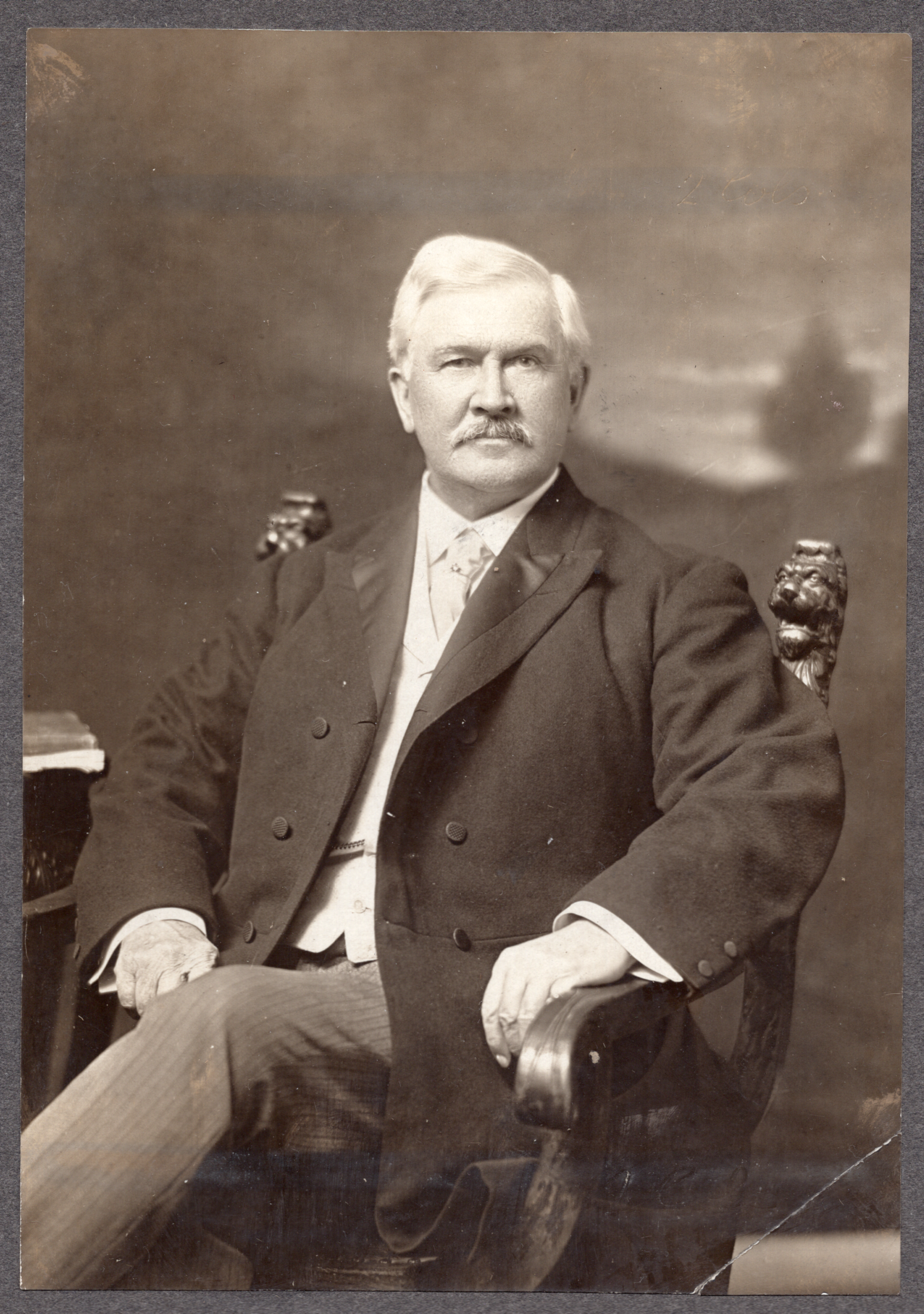

Archibald Blue (3 February 1840 – 27 July 1914), born in Orford Township, Upper Canada, was a teacher, journalist, and civil servant.

In 1900 Blue was made "temporary" special commissioner to prepare a blueprint for the census of 1901. In 1905 he was made chief of a permanent census and statistics office that was located at the Ontario Department of Agriculture.
