= Wayne Smith (statistician) =

Canadian economist and statistician

- Born: Chilliwack, British Columbia
- Education: Carleton University
- Occupations: Civil servant, economist

Chief Statistician of Canada
- In office 2010–2016
- Prime Minister: Stephen Harper; Justin Trudeau
- Minister: Tony Clement; Christian Paradis; James Moore; Navdeep Bains
- Preceded by: Munir Sheikh
- Succeeded by: Anil Arora

Wayne R. Smith is a Canadian economist who served as the Chief Statistician of Canada from 2 September 2010 to 16 September 2016. He was appointed after his predecessor, Munir Sheikh, resigned in protest over the Federal Government's decision to end the mandatory long-form census. Smith also resigned in protest over concerns about the Federal Government's centralization of IT services. He argued that Statistics Canada needed to control its own IT infrastructure to protect its independence.

Smith earned a Bachelor of Arts (Honours) in economics in 1979 and a master's degree in economics in 1985 from Carleton University in Ottawa. He had worked for Statistics Canada since 1981. Throughout his career at the agency, Smith served as the director of the Communications Division, the director of the Special Surveys Division, the director general of the Regional Operations Branch, and the assistant chief statistician of the Communications and Operations Field and the Business and Trade Statistics Field.

== See also ==
- Chief Statistician of Canada
- National Statistics Council
- Shared Services Canada
- Statistics Canada
