= 2026 census =

2026 census may refer to:

- 2026 Canadian census
- 2026 Australian census
- 2027 Indian census, which began in 2026
