= 2006 Canadian census =

Censuses in Canada

- May 16, 2006

General information
- Country: Canada

Results
- Total population: 31,612,897 (▲5.4%)
- Most populous province/territory: Ontario (12,160,282)
- Least populous province/territory: Nunavut (29,474)

The 2006 Canadian census was a detailed enumeration of the Canadian population. Census day was May 16, 2006. The following census was the 2011 census. Canada's total population enumerated by the 2006 census was 31,612,897. This count was lower than the official July 1, 2006 population estimate of 32,623,490 people. The previous census was the 2001 census and the following census was in 2011 census.

== Summary ==
Over 12.7 million households, 32.5 million people were expected to be counted. Canada Post delivered census forms by mail to 70% of the country, primarily residents in urban areas. Census enumerators delivered to the remaining 30% of households. Every fifth home received the long questionnaire (53 questions versus 8 questions on the short form). For the first time, Canadian residents were able to go online to fill in their forms. Statistics Canada expected approximately 20% of households to file their surveys electronically. Persistent census staff are contacting tardy households. The total estimated cost of the 2006 census is $567 million spread over seven years, employing more than 25,000 full and part-time census workers.

New in the 2006 census questionnaire:

- Education. Where did individuals receive their highest level of education? (Only on extended questionnaire)
- Income. Permission to use income information from an individual's income tax file. Income from child benefits. Income tax paid. (Also only on extended questionnaire)
- Access to personal information. Permission to make information public in 92 years.

Questions not asked in the 2006 census:

- Religion. Normally asked only once every 10 years, and the religion question was asked in the 2001 census.
- Education. The number of years of schooling received.

=== Modified questions ===
- Education

== Data products ==
As the data were compiled, Statistics Canada released various census data products. The first set of data products was released on March 13, 2007, originally scheduled for release on February 13, 2007, covering population and dwelling counts by geographical unit. This was followed by other census data products.

=== Population and dwelling counts ===
The first release of 2006 census data was on March 13, 2007, covering population and dwelling counts by geographical unit.

Population of the provinces and territories

== Population and dwellings ==
Rank	Province or territory	Population as of 2006 census	Population as of 2001 census	Change	Percent change
1	Ontario	12,160,282	11,410,046	750,236 ▲	6.6 ▲
2	Quebec	7,546,131	7,237,479	308,652 ▲	4.3 ▲
3	British Columbia	4,113,487	3,907,738	205,749 ▲	5.3 ▲
4	Alberta	3,290,350	2,974,807	315,543 ▲	10.6 ▲
5	Manitoba	1,148,401	1,119,583	28,818 ▲	2.6 ▲
6	Saskatchewan	968,157	978,933	-10,776 ▼	-1.1 ▼
7	Nova Scotia	913,462	908,007	5,455 ▲	0.6 ▲
8	New Brunswick	729,997	729,498	499 ▲	0.1 ▲
9	Newfoundland and Labrador	505,469	512,930	-7,461 ▼	-1.5 ▼
10	Prince Edward Island	135,851	135,294	557 ▲	0.4 ▲
11	Northwest Territories	41,464	37,360	4,104 ▲	11.0 ▲
12	Yukon	30,372	28,674	1,698 ▲	5.9 ▲
13	Nunavut	29,474	26,745	2,729 ▲	10.2 ▲
	Canada	31,612,897	30,007,094	1,605,803 ▲	5.4 ▲

=== Age and sex ===
The second release of 2006 census data was on July 17, 2007, covering age and sex of the Canadian population. Among other findings, Statistics Canada reported that the 65-and-over population was at a record high of 13.7% of the total population of Canada. By comparison, the 2001 census found that the 65-and-over population was 13.0% of the total population of Canada.

Population of each province and territory by age and sex

Province / territory	0 to 14	15–64	65+	Males	Females
Newfoundland and Labrador	78,230	356,975	70,265	245,730	259,740
Prince Edward Island	23,985	91,685	20,185	65,595	70,260
Nova Scotia	146,435	628,815	138,210	439,835	473,630
New Brunswick	118,255	504,110	107,635	355,495	374,500
Quebec	1,252,510	5,213,335	1,080,285	3,687,695	3,858,435
Ontario	2,210,800	8,300,300	1,649,180	5,930,700	6,229,580
Manitoba	225,175	761,340	161,890	563,275	585,125
Saskatchewan	187,695	631,155	149,305	475,240	492,915
Alberta	631,515	2,305,425	353,410	1,646,800	1,643,550
British Columbia	679,605	2,834,075	599,810	2,013,985	2,099,495
Yukon	5,720	22,365	2,290	15,280	15,090
Northwest Territories	9,920	29,570	1,975	21,225	20,240
Nunavut	10,000	18,660	810	15,105	14,365
Canada	5,579,835	21,697,805	4,335,255	15,475,970	16,136,925

=== Families, marital status, households and dwelling characteristics ===
The third release of 2006 census data was on September 12, 2007, and covered families/households, marital status, and dwelling characteristics.

The following table displays various census data (derived from the 20% sample that completed the long questionnaire) on marital status for the Canadian population aged 15 years or more, as well as data on the number of couples by various criteria, and where available the percentage change from the 2001 census:

	Number	% change (2001–2006)
Population aged 15 years and over	26,033,060	+7.2
Legally married (and not separated)	12,470,400	+3.8
Separated, but still legally married	775,425	+5.7
Divorced	2,087,390	+12.5
Widowed	1,612,815	+4.6
In a common-law relationship	2,731,635	+19.6
In a same-sex union	90,695	+32.6
Same-sex couples	45,350	
Male same-sex married couples	4,010	
Female same-sex married couples	3,455	
Male same-sex common-law couples	20,730	
Female same-sex common-law couples	17,155	
All couples	7,482,780	+6.0
Married couples with children	3,443,775	-0.7
Married couples without children	2,662,130	+9.5
Common-law couples with children	618,150	+16.4
Common-law couples without children	758,715	+20.9

=== Immigration, citizenship, language, mobility and migration ===
The fourth release of 2006 census data was on December 4, 2007, and covered immigration, citizenship, language, mobility, migration and other population data.

=== Aboriginal peoples ===
The fifth release of 2006 census data was on January 15, 2008, covering aboriginal peoples.

=== Labour, place of work/commuting to work, education, language ===
The sixth release of 2006 census data was on March 4, 2008, covering labour, education and some other topics going with that.

=== Ethnic origin, visible minorities ===
The seventh release of 2006 census data was on April 2, 2008, covering ethnic origins and visible minorities and commuting to work.

=== Income/earnings, shelter costs ===
The eighth release of 2006 census data was on May 1, 2008, covering income and earnings, and shelter costs.

== Advertising ==
In contrast to 1996 focus-groups that found it important to know the legal requirement at the outset, participants of 2005 focus-groups were annoyed or provoked by draft ads reminding Canadians about the census law. As a result of the finding, Statistics Canada's initial newspaper, radio and TV ads avoided mention of the legal requirement. Instead, reference to the census law was highlighted only in ads appearing after census day, to capture late filers.

To encourage participation, Statistics Canada set aside $13 million for "saturation" advertising, including billboards, bookmarks, inserts in municipal tax bills, and ads on bags of sugar and milk cartons.

== Outsourcing ==
Statistics Canada reports less than 20% of the work will be outsourced, spending $85 million over 5 years. Despite an open public tender process, controversy arose on the announcement of a $43.3 million deal awarded to Lockheed Martin Canada—a subsidiary of Lockheed Martin, the world's largest defense contractor by defense revenue—for the purchase of scanning and printing software and hardware.

== Forms ==
A variety of forms were available in both official languages, varying in length, colour, and recipient's location.

Most households (80%) received the short form (2A):

- English: orange
- French: yellow

One in five received the long form (2B):

- English: red
- French: purple

Federal and provincial employees and their families working in embassies and National Defence bases abroad (2C):

- English: purple
- French: red

In the three northern territories and on Aboriginal communities and settlements (2D):

- English: orange
- French: yellow

Census of Agriculture (6):

- English: yellow
- French: orange

== Controversy ==
Special interest groups criticised Statistics Canada over the design of questions, accuracy, and the future of the census data:

- Question 6: Relationship. Couples in same-sex marriages were offended by and/or objected to Statistics Canada's instruction that they use the write-in field "Other" instead of checking the "husband or wife" box.
- Question 16: Mother tongue. An anonymous email misinformation campaign advised bilingual francophones to not mention their knowledge of English.
- Question 53: Election to release census data after 92 years. Genealogists worried that future research will be hampered if Canadians didn't check this box.

Nationally, there was a yes response in respect of 55.58% of persons enumerated in the census. The yes percentage was highest in Prince Edward Island, 64.50%, and lowest in Nunavut, 51.39%. Individual respondents are permitted to change their response to this question by mailing in a request-for-change form.

In addition, Statistics Canada's online questionnaire had been criticized over accessibility issues:

- Failure to comply with Treasury Board, guidelines to meet W3C accessibility recommendations for the visually impaired
- Failure to support open source, operating systems. Support for Linux was eventually added, but support for other operating systems was not.

The quality of data was further hampered by individuals who advocated minimal cooperation or non-cooperation, in protest to the outsourcing contract awarded to Lockheed Martin. Many people believed that Lockheed Martin would have access to their information, and that the US government could then access that information through the USA PATRIOT Act. However, despite assurances to the contrary (i.e., only Statistics Canada employees would and could handle, store, and access the information), some people refused to participate fully in the census.

The release of data was postponed to numerous issues during enumeration. These included:

- the recruitment of enumerators amid a competitive job market, particularly in Western Canada
- the requirement of some people to fill out a second form after their first forms did not arrive in the mail; and
- delays in payments to enumerators

As a result, the first release of data from the census, originally scheduled for release on February 13, 2007, was delayed to March 13, 2007.

== See also ==
- 2011 Canadian census
- Demographics of Canada
- Statistics Act
- Population and housing censuses by country
