= Southern Border Region =

Geopolitical designation in the U.S. State of California

Coordinates: 32.9109°N 115.7971°W

Economic regions of California - Southern Border Region in purple

The Southern Border Region is one of nine geopolitical designations in California used for economic analysis. The region includes San Diego County and Imperial County, each of which borders Mexico. Its largest city is San Diego.

The Southern Border Region is adjacent to the Southern California Region, which consists of five counties (Orange, Los Angeles, San Bernardino, Riverside, and Ventura). These regions were created in about 1998, when the California Regional Economies Project identified 9 regional economies. The California Economic Strategy Panel used employment and wage information reported by employers for public policy-making, planning, and program administration. As an example of information reported by the panel, according to the 2009 report, the gross domestic product of the region had grown 68.5% in five years. Other agencies such as the California Public Utilities Commission also provide reports for the region.

== See also ==
- Metropolitan areas
  - San Diego metropolitan area
  - El Centro metropolitan area
  - San Diego–Tijuana metropolitan area
  - Mexicali–Calexico metropolitan area
- Metropolitan planning agencies
  - San Diego Association of Governments
  - Southern California Association of Governments
- List of economic regions of California

== Bibliography ==
- "Economic Strategy Panel - The Southern Border Region". California Economic Strategy Panel.
- "Economic Strategy Panel". California Labor and Workforce Development Agency. Archived from the original on 2011-07-11.
