= George Alfred Barnard =

British statistician (1915–2002)

George A. Barnard
- Born: 23 September 1915; Walthamstow, London, England
- Died: 30 July 2002 (aged 86); Brightlingsea, Essex, England
- Citizenship: United Kingdom
- Education: University of Cambridge; Princeton University
- Scientific career
- Fields: Statistics
- Institutions: Imperial College London; University of Essex; University of Waterloo
- Doctoral advisor: Alonzo Church
- Doctoral students: Dennis Lindley; K. D. Tocher; Vidyadhar P. Godambe; Robin Plackett

George Alfred Barnard (23 September 1915 – 30 July 2002) was a British statistician known particularly for his work on the foundations of statistics and on quality control.

== Early life and education ==
George Barnard was born in Walthamstow, London. His father was a cabinet maker and his mother had been a domestic servant. His sister Dorothy Wedderburn became a sociologist and eventually Principal of Royal Holloway, University of London. Barnard attended the local grammar school, the Monoux School, and from there he won a scholarship to St John's College, Cambridge, to read mathematics. In 1937 he went on to Princeton University to do graduate work on mathematical logic with Alonzo Church.

== Career ==
Barnard was on holiday in Britain when the Second World War started and he never went back to Princeton to finish his PhD. The war made Barnard into a statistician as it did for many mathematicians of his generation. In 1940 he joined an engineering firm, Plessey, as a mathematical consultant. In 1942 he moved to the Ministry of Supply to apply quality control and sampling methods to the products for which they were responsible. It was there that Barnard began doing statistics. The group he was put in charge of included Peter Armitage, Dennis Lindley and Robin Plackett. Lindley recalls that they were like students working for a doctorate with Barnard as supervisor. Abraham Wald was in a similar group in the United States. Both groups developed sequential methods of sampling.

At the end of the war, Barnard went to Imperial College London, as a lecturer, becoming a reader in 1948 and professor of mathematical statistics in 1954. In 1961 he was elected as a Fellow of the American Statistical Association. In 1966 he moved to the newly created University of Essex, from which he retired in 1975. Barnard, however, kept on doing statistics until he died aged 86. Until 1981 he spent much of each year at the University of Waterloo, Canada, and after that he continued writing papers and corresponding with colleagues all over the world.

Barnard's best known contribution is probably his 1962 paper on likelihood inference but the paper he thought his best was the 1949 paper in which he first espoused the likelihood principle. He had originally described the principle in the context of optional stopping. A statement by Leonard Savage brings out how surprising the principle first seemed:

I learned the stopping rule principle from Professor Barnard in ... 1952. Frankly, I then thought it a scandal that anyone in the profession could advance an idea so patently wrong, even as today I can scarcely believe that some people resist an idea so patently right.

== Political activism ==
In an interview Barnard recalled, "my main interest above everything was politics from about 1933 until 1956. Well, that’s not true – until the end of the war it would be fair to say." At school he proposed the motion to the school debating society that "Socialism is preferable to Capitalism." He joined the Communist Party of Great Britain in 1933 and took part in anti-fascist marches in the east end of London. The historian Eric Hobsbawm, a fellow communist at Cambridge, recalled him as a "lean-and-hungry-looking mathematician from a working class family" who served as the "student Party's chief local commissar." At Plessey he was chairman of the shop stewards.

== Awards ==
Barnard served terms as president of three societies: Operational Research Society in 1962–1964, the Institute of Mathematics and its Applications in 1970–1971, and the Royal Statistical Society in 1971–1972. He was awarded the Guy Medal in Gold by the Royal Statistical Society in 1975.

In May 1986, Barnard was awarded an honorary degree by the Open University as Doctor of the university, and in 1994 he was awarded an honorary doctorate by the University of Essex.

== Personal life ==
He married first, Helen J.B. Davis in 1942 and they had three sons. He married second, Mary M.L. Jones in 1949 and they had one son. He was a Distinguished Supporter of the British Humanist Association.

Barnard died at his home in Essex in August 2002. Dennis Lindley, writing in The Statistician, remarked that "We have lost a great statistician and a delightful human being."

== Publications ==
- Barnard, G.A. (1945). "A new test for 2×2 tables". Nature. 156 (3954): 177 & 783. Bibcode:1945Natur.156..177B. doi:10.1038/156177a0. S2CID 186244479.
- Barnard, G.A. (1946). "Sequential tests in industrial statistics". Journal of the Royal Statistical Society. Supplement. 8 (1): 1–26. doi:10.2307/2983610. JSTOR 2983610.
- Barnard, G.A. (1949). "Statistical Inference". Journal of the Royal Statistical Society. B. 11 (2): 115–149. doi:10.1111/j.2517-6161.1949.tb00028.x. JSTOR 2984075.
- Barnard, G.A. (195). "Control charts and stochastic processes". Journal of the Royal Statistical Society. B. B (21): 239–271.
- Barnard, G.A.; Jenkins, G.M.; Winsten, C.B. (1962). "Likelihood Inference and Time Series". Journal of the Royal Statistical Society. 125 (3): 321–372. doi:10.2307/2982406. JSTOR 2982406.
- Geisser, Seymour; et al., eds. (1990). Bayesian and Likelihood Methods in Statistics and Econometrics: Essays in honor of George A. Barnard. North-Holland. – This contains a review of Barnard's work by Lindley. The volume was one of a series honouring Bayesian heroes. There is a bibliography (citing 109 articles) up to 1989.

In 1990 he made a book out of manuscripts left by his friend Egon Pearson:

- Pearson, E. S. (1990). Plackett, R.L.; Barnard, G.A. (eds.). 'Student', a statistical biography of William Sealy Gosset. Oxford, UK: Oxford University Press.

After 1990 Barnard published little, although he kept up his letter writing. In 1996 however he produced a review of Barndorff-Nielsen and Cox after observing that, "A great virtue of the book is that it raises perhaps as many questions as it answers," Barnard went on to give his answer to one of those questions:

- Cox, D.R. (1996). "Review of Inference and Asymptotics by O.E. Barndorff-Nielsen". Journal of the Royal Statistical Society. 159: 178–179.

== See also ==
- Barnardisation
- List of University of Waterloo people
