= Timothy Plumptre =

Canadian governance expert

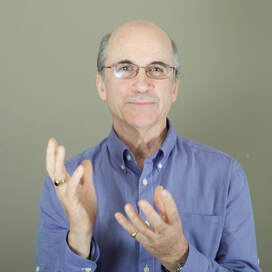
- Plumptre in 2018
- Born: November 27, 1943
- Died: January 16, 2025 (aged 81)
- Education: Political Science (BA), Economics (MSc) and Management (Certificate)
- Alma mater: University of Toronto, London School of Economics, University of Oxford
- Occupation: Founding President Institute on Governance
- Known for: Governance
- Notable work: Beyond the Bottom Line, The Intrepid Nonprofit

Timothy Wynne Plumptre (November 27, 1943 – January 16, 2025) was an author and the Founding President of the Institute on Governance in Ottawa, Canada.

== Education ==
Tim Plumptre earned an Honours BA in political science and economics at the University of Toronto (1965), an MSc Econ from the London School of Economics (1966), and a Certificate in Management Studies at the University of Oxford (1973).

== Career ==
Tim Plumptre began his career as a foreign service officer, then worked as a journalist with the Globe and Mail, returning to Ottawa in the late '60s to work at the Canadian International Development Agency and as Special Assistant to a federal cabinet minister. He then worked as an independent management consultant and with the international consulting firm William Mercer.

He founded the nonprofit Institute on Governance (IOG) in 1990. During the 16 years of his presidency, the think-tank grew to approximately 20 staff working on domestic and international assignments. He continued consulting after he left the IOG in 2007.

He was a Visiting Scholar at Massey College and an Adjunct Professor at Carleton University. As a volunteer, he provided leadership to numerous organizations in the National Capital, including the Children's Aid Society and the Community Care Access Centre of Ottawa-Carleton, and the Hospice at Maycourt.

== Books ==
- Timothy W. Plumptre (1988). Beyond the Bottom Line: Management in Government, Institute for Research on Public Policy (IRPP), Halifax, Canada
- Tim Plumptre (2019). The Intrepid Nonprofit: Strategies for Success in Turbulent Times, FriesenPress

== See also ==
Tim Plumptre: Heritage house owner vows to rebuild (CBC TV News, 2013)
