= 2026 Canadian census =

Detailed enumeration of Canadian residents in 2026

- May 12, 2026

General information
- Country: Canada
- Authority: Statistics Canada
- Website: statcan.gc.ca/census

In 2026, Canada conducted a national census with a reference date of May 12, 2026. It follows the 2021 Canadian census, which recorded a population of 36,991,981.

== Execution ==
Statistics Canada announced in January 2026 that it intended to hire roughly 32,000 workers to conduct the census. Enumeration began in February 2026 for some northern and remote communities. The 2026 census is the first to incorporate questions about sexual orientation (for respondents aged 15 years or older), homelessness, and health problems in the long-form questionnaire.

Statistics Canada announced completion of the census on September 14, 2026. In terms of participation, 98.4% of households completed the census, up from 98.0% in 2021 and on par with the 98.4% recorded in 2016. Of the 98.4% completions, the online response rate was 88.6% while 91.2% responded without help from Statistics Canada.

== Data release schedule ==
Geographic and reference products for the 2026 census will be released on November 18, 2026. Data from the 2026 census is scheduled to be released over the course of 2027, organized by topic/theme:

- February 10, 2027, for population and dwelling counts
- May 5, 2027, for age, gender, sex at birth, and type of dwellings
- July 14, 2027, for families, households, marital status, and income
- September 8, 2027, for language, housing, and Canadian military experience
- September 28, 2027, for Indigenous peoples, mobility, and poverty
- October 27, 2027, for immigration, place of birth, citizenship, ethnocultural and religious diversity, sexual orientation, and general health
- December 1, 2027, for labour, commuting, language of work, instruction in the minority official language, education, and homelessness

== See also ==
- Demographics of Canada
- Statistics Act
- Population and housing censuses by country
