= Munir Sheikh =

Former Chief Statistician of Canada

Munir Sheikh (born 1947) is a Canadian economist.

== Early career ==
Born in Pakistan in 1947, Sheikh received a Master of Arts in economics from McMaster University in 1970, and earned his doctorate in economics from the University of Western Ontario in 1973. He is married with 3 children.

Sheikh began his public service career as an economist with the Economic Council of Canada from 1972 to 1976. After a brief stint with the National Energy Board between 1976 and 1978, he joined the Department of Finance and rose to the rank of Senior Assistant Deputy Minister in 2000.

Between 2001 and 2006, he held senior positions with Health Canada, the Privy Council Office, and Human Resources and Social Development Canada. He has also taught at the University of Ottawa and Carleton University. Later in his career, Sheikh oversaw a $100-billion tax-reduction policy and helped craft the 2005 budget. He was praised by a former colleague as "the best economist in the federal government."

== Statistics Canada and controversial resignation ==
Sheikh was appointed as the head of Statistics Canada by Prime Minister Stephen Harper. He officially became the Chief Statistician of Canada on June 16, 2008, replacing Ivan Fellegi.

On July 21, 2010, Sheikh resigned from that post, following a controversy resulting from the Conservative government's decision to no longer require mandatory completion of the Canada 2011 Census long form. The decision has been heavily criticised; opponents have argued that the decision was politically motivated and that it will compromise the value of census data.

Following his resignation, in a public letter, Sheikh expressed his disapproval of the government's decision, writing:

I want to take this opportunity to comment on a technical statistical issue which has become the subject of media discussion. This relates to the question of whether a voluntary survey can become a substitute for a mandatory census.

It can not.

Industry Minister Tony Clement has stated that the change to voluntary forms was made because of privacy-related complaints, though he acknowledged that the decision was made without consultations with governments that rely on the census data. Media reports claiming Clement had said that this change was made on the advice of Statistics Canada were later shown to be incorrect, although this did not change Mr. Sheikh's decision to resign, as he felt the mere perception StatsCan supported the decision was cause for resignation. Emails and a speech prepared by Sheikh, which have subsequently been released, demonstrate that Sheikh had always been opposed to the decision. It appeared that the government had misrepresented his position. In an interview with the CBC he stated that the government has tried to make it "quite clear that it was my view that the quality of the data from the voluntary survey would be as good as data from the mandatory census, which isn't what I believed in." Clement has denied allegations that he misrepresented Sheikh's position in relation to the change.

Government offices
Preceded by Maryantonett Flumian	Deputy Minister of Labour; 2005–2008	Succeeded by Hélène Gosselin
Preceded by Ivan Fellegi	Chief Statistician of Canada; 2008–2010	Succeeded by Wayne Smith
