= Canadian Digital Service =

- Service numérique canadien (French)
- Logo of the Canadian Digital Service

Agency overview
- Formed: July 2017
- Dissolved: Merger announced 2026-09-03; formal transfer pending order in council
- Superseding agency: Digital Transformation Canada (planned)
- Jurisdiction: Government of Canada
- Headquarters: Ottawa, Ontario
- Motto: “We empower public servants to serve people better.”
- Employees: ~250 (2024)
- Agency executive: Paul N. Wagner, Chief Executive Officer (final)
- Parent department: Employment and Social Development Canada (2023–2026); Treasury Board of Canada Secretariat (2017–2023)
- Website: digital.canada.ca

The Canadian Digital Service (CDS; French: SNC) is a unit of the Government of Canada mandated to improve how federal departments designed and delivered digital services to the public. It has operated since 2017. On 3 September 2026, the federal government announced plans to fold CDS into a newly created organization, Digital Transformation Canada; as with previous machinery-of-government changes affecting CDS, formal implementation requires an order in council, which had not been issued as of the announcement.

CDS was established under the Treasury Board of Canada Secretariat in July 2017, following Budget 2017, and was loosely modelled on comparable government digital units such as the United States Digital Service, 18F in the United States and the Government Digital Service in the United Kingdom. Its stated mandate was to "change the way the federal government designs and delivers digital services." In 2023 CDS was transferred from Treasury Board Secretariat to Employment and Social Development Canada (ESDC).

== History ==
=== Founding and early mandate (2017–2018) ===
CDS was created in July 2017 as an in-house digital consultancy within the Treasury Board Secretariat. The Secretary of the Treasury Board, Yaprak Baltacıoğlu, launched an international recruitment process for the organization's first chief executive officer in September 2017. Aaron Snow, a co-founder of the United States digital consultancy 18F and a former Presidential Innovation Fellow, was named CDS's first CEO in March 2018 and took up the role that April.

=== Growth and early products (2018–2021) ===
By its second year of operation, CDS reported having worked with eight federal departments and delivered eleven digital products and services, including a benefits-navigation tool for Veterans Affairs Canada and support for the Impact Canada innovation-challenges platform. During this period CDS built a government-wide notification platform, later known as GC Notify, adapting open-source code originally released by the UK's Government Digital Service.

CDS's most widely used product was COVID Alert, a COVID-19 exposure-notification mobile application developed in 2020 in partnership with Health Canada, Innovation, Science and Economic Development Canada and the Ontario Digital Service. The app adapted "COVID Shield," code originally built by Shopify volunteers, and underwent security review by BlackBerry and the Canadian Centre for Cyber Security. COVID Alert launched in Ontario in July 2020 and was later adopted by most provinces before being discontinued in June 2022.

In Budget 2021, CDS received ongoing funding, converting it from a time-limited pilot into a permanent federal organization.

=== Leadership transition (2022) ===
Aaron Snow stepped down as CEO in early 2022, by which point CDS had grown to more than 115 employees. Executive Director Anatole Papadopoulos served as CEO following Snow's departure. Following Papadopoulos's departure, CDS's CEO was Jessie Adcock. Paul N. Wagner, previously deputy chief information officer of Canada at Treasury Board Secretariat, was subsequently appointed CEO, a role he held until CDS's dissolution in 2026.

=== Transfer to Employment and Social Development Canada (2023) ===
On 26 July 2023, an order in council (P.C. 2023-784) transferred control and supervision of CDS from Treasury Board Secretariat to ESDC. The move coincided with the appointment of Terry Beech as Canada's first Minister of Citizens' Services and was intended to align CDS more closely with ESDC's front-line service delivery through Service Canada.

=== Strategy and evaluation (2023–2025) ===
Under Wagner, CDS published a series of planning documents, including its 2023–24 annual report, a three-year strategic vision known as "CDSNext," and annual tactical plans. By 2024, CDS employed roughly 250 people.

A Treasury Board Secretariat evaluation of CDS recommended that the organization more clearly define its authorities and resourcing, better communicate its mandate within the wider federal digital ecosystem, and re-examine how its products and expertise were scaled across departments. A 2024 analysis by The Logic compared CDS's trajectory to that of the since-dissolved Ontario Digital Service, noting that one of CDS's founders had expressed concern about the organization's long-term durability within the federal bureaucracy.

=== Planned merger into Digital Transformation Canada (2026) ===
On 3 September 2026, Prime Minister Mark Carney announced the creation of Digital Transformation Canada (DTC), a new federal organization intended to combine Shared Services Canada with selected functions of the Treasury Board of Canada Secretariat, Public Services and Procurement Canada, and CDS. Former Google chief financial officer Patrick Pichette was named CEO of DTC, which reports to the Minister of Government Transformation, Public Services and Procurement, Joël Lightbound. The announcement formed part of the government's broader "AI for All" national artificial intelligence strategy.

As with CDS's 2023 transfer to ESDC, formally moving CDS's functions into DTC requires an order in council under the Public Service Rearrangement and Transfer of Duties Act. No such order had been made as of the September 2026 announcement, meaning CDS continued to exist as a distinct organization under ESDC pending that step.

== Products and services ==
Over its operating history, CDS developed and maintained a number of government-wide digital tools and platforms, including:

- GC Notify: a shared platform allowing federal departments to send service-related email and text notifications to users.
- COVID Alert: a national COVID-19 exposure-notification mobile application (2020–2022).
- GC Forms: a tool enabling departments to build policy-compliant online forms without custom development.
- Support for the Impact Canada challenges and prizes platform, which by the early 2020s had hosted more than half a billion dollars in innovation prizes and challenges across departments.

CDS also worked directly with individual departments on service-design projects, including eligibility and benefits navigation for Veterans Affairs Canada, disability-benefits delivery with ESDC, and aspects of online tax filing with the Canada Revenue Agency.

== Organization ==
CDS operated as a special unit within its parent department rather than as a standalone statutory agency, first under Treasury Board Secretariat (2017–2023) and then under ESDC (2023–2026). Its headquarters were in Ottawa, Ontario, with staff working from multiple locations across Canada. Staffing grew from roughly 115 employees in 2022 to approximately 250 by 2024. In early 2022, CDS adopted the tagline "We empower public servants to serve people better."

== See also ==
- Digital Transformation Canada
- Shared Services Canada
- COVID Alert
- Government Digital Service
- 18F
- United States Digital Service
