= List of regions of California =

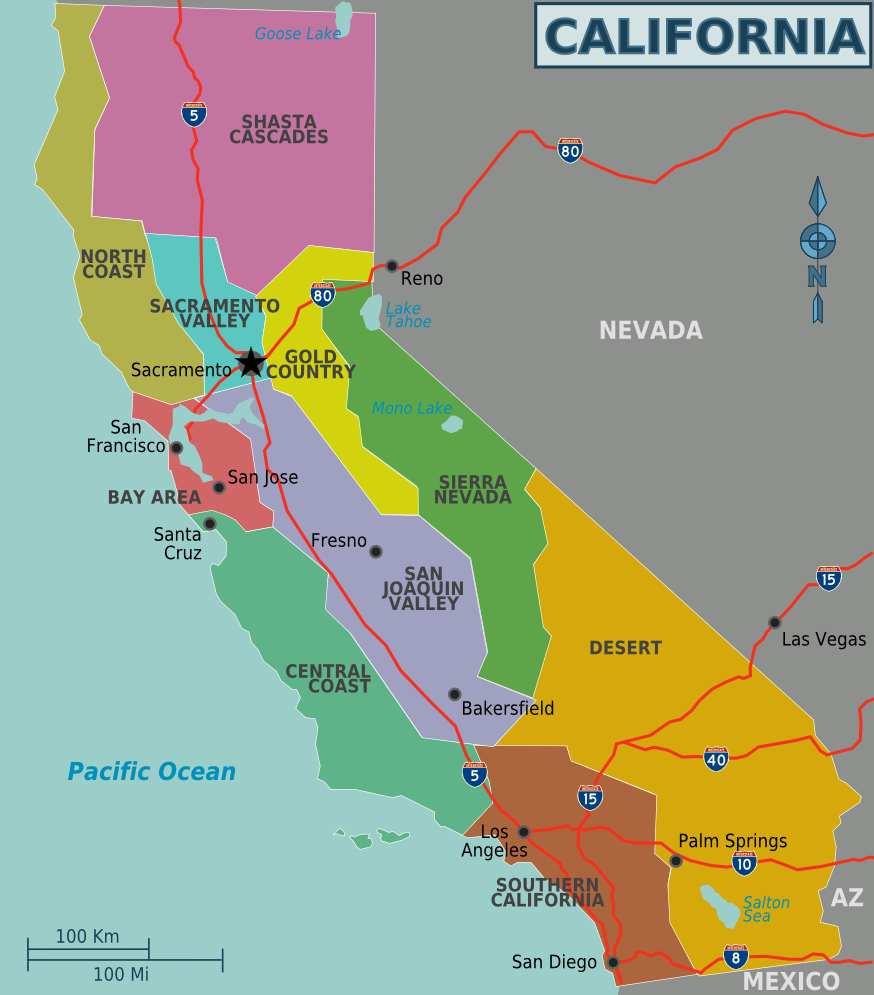
Major regions of California

This is a list of regions of the state of California, organized by location. Many of these regions have distinct geographic features and climates. The four major regions include Coastal California, the Sierra Nevada mountain range, the Central Valley, and the Mojave Desert area.

== Northern California ==
=== Central California ===
- Central California
  - Central Valley
  - Central Coast (North)
    - Big Sur
    - Monterey Bay
    - Salinas Valley
    - Santa Cruz Mountains
  - Diablo Range
  - San Joaquin Valley (North)
    - Metropolitan Fresno

=== Great Basin ===
- Great Basin
  - Eastern Sierra
    - Owens Valley
  - Tricorner Region/Surprise Valley
    - Modoc Plateau
    - Warner Mountains

=== North Coast ===
- North Coast
  - Lost Coast
  - Emerald Triangle
  - Klamath Mountains
  - Mendocino Mountains
  - Humboldt
  - Jefferson

=== Sacramento Valley ===
- Sacramento Valley
  - Sacramento metropolitan area
  - Yuba-Sutter area
    - Sutter Buttes

=== Sacramento-San Joaquin River Delta ===
- Sacramento-San Joaquin River Delta
  - San Joaquin County

=== San Francisco Bay Area ===
- San Francisco Bay Area
  - East Bay
    - Oakland–Alameda County
    - Tri-Valley Area
      - Amador Valley
      - Livermore Valley
      - San Ramon Valley
    - Lamorinda
  - North Bay
    - Marin County
      - West Marin
      - Ross Valley
    - Wine Country
      - Napa Valley
      - Russian River Valley
      - Sonoma Valley
    - Telecom Valley
  - The Peninsula
    - City and County of San Francisco
    - San Mateo County
  - South Bay
    - Santa Clara Valley
      - San Jose–Santa Clara County
      - Silicon Valley

=== Sierra Nevada ===
- Sierra Nevada
  - Gold Country
  - Lake Tahoe
  - Yosemite

=== Shasta Cascade ===
- Shasta Cascade
  - Mount Shasta
  - Redding Area
  - Trinity Alps

== Southern California ==
=== Central Coast ===
- Central Coast (South) /Tri-Counties
  - San Luis Obispo Area
    - Five Cities
  - Santa Barbara Area
    - Santa Ynez Valley
  - Cuyama Valley

=== Desert Region ===
- Desert Region
  - Mojave Desert
    - Death Valley
    - High Desert
      - Antelope Valley
      - Morongo Valley
      - Victor Valley
    - Panamint Range
  - Colorado Desert
    - Low Desert
      - Coachella Valley
      - Imperial Valley
        - Calexico–Mexicali
    - Palo Verde Valley
    - Yuha Desert

=== Inland Southern California ===
- Inland Empire
  - Cucamonga Valley
  - San Jacinto Valley
  - San Bernardino Valley
    - San Bernardino
      - Downtown San Bernardino
  - Chino Valley
  - Perris Valley
  - San Gorgonio Pass
  - San Bernardino Mountains
  - San Jacinto Mountains
  - Temecula Valley
- San Joaquin Valley (South)
  - Kern County
- Tehachapi Mountains

=== South Coast ===
- South Coast
  - Ventura County
    - Oxnard Plain
    - Conejo Valley
      - Thousand Oaks
    - East County- Moorpark, Simi Valley
  - Channel Islands
  - Tovaangar
  - Greater Los Angeles
    - Malibu
    - Los Angeles Basin
      - Gateway Cities
      - Los Angeles City
        - East Los Angeles
        - Harbor Area
        - Northeast Los Angeles
        - South Los Angeles
        - Westside
        - Silicon Beach
      - South Bay
        - Beach Cities
        - Palos Verdes Peninsula
    - San Gabriel Valley
      - Pomona Valley
      - Puente Hills
    - Peninsular Ranges (North)
      - San Jacinto Mountains
      - Santa Rosa Mountains
    - Santa Clarita Valley
    - San Gabriel Mountains
    - San Fernando Valley
      - Crescenta Valley
    - Santa Monica Mountains
      - Hollywood Hills
    - Orange County Area
      - Santa Ana-Anaheim-Irvine, CA
        - Santa Ana
      - South Coast Metro
    - Santa Ana Valley
    - Saddleback Valley
    - Santa Ana Mountains
  - San Diego–Tijuana
    - San Diego metropolitan area
      - North County
        - North County Coastal
        - North County Inland
        - Temecula Valley
      - East County
        - Mountain Empire
      - South Bay

== See also ==
- List of economic regions of California
- List of regions of the United States
