= Economic region =

Economic region could refer to:

== Countries ==
- Economic regions of Azerbaijan
- Economic regions of Egypt
- Economic regions of Russia
- Economic regions of Ukraine

== Subregions ==
- Economic regions of Wales, United Kingdom
- Economic regions of California, United States
