= Herbert Marshall (statistician) =

Canadian academic and statistician

Herbert Marshall OBE (1888–1977) was a Canadian academic, statistician, and third Dominion Statistician from 1945 until his retirement in 1956.

== Early years ==
Herbert Marshall graduated from the University of Toronto in 1915 and worked for two years as part of that university's economics staff. His academic was interrupted by military service during World War I.

== Career at the Dominion Bureau of Statistics ==
He began his 35-year career at the Dominion Bureau of Statistics in 1921 as a prices statistician. He was later responsible for directing work in the balance of international payments and Canadian-American investment flows.

In 1939, his work in the area of international trade had been recognized by the award of the Gold Medal of the Professional Institute of the Civil Service.

During World War II, Marshall worked for the Wartime Prices and Trade Board and set up the regional manpower records for the National Selective Service. For his efforts he was appointed as an Officer of the Order of the British Empire.

Marshall took on increasing responsibilities for the administration of the bureau. In 1942, he was appointed Assistant Dominion Statistician. Following the death of Sedley Cudmore in 1945, he assumed the office Dominion Statistician. As head of the Bureau of Statistics he made significant contributions in adapting and extending the Canadian statistical system to meet the new information needs following World War II.

In 1947 he was elected as a Fellow of the American Statistical Association.
