= Dominion Bureau of Statistics =

The Dominion Bureau of Statistics was a Canadian government organization responsible for conducting censuses. It was formed in 1918 by the Statistics Act, but was replaced by Statistics Canada in 1971.

The Dominion Statisticians were:

- Robert H. Coats (1918–1942)
- Sedley A. Cudmore (1942–1945)
- Herbert Marshall (1945–1956)
- Walter E. Duffett (1957–1972)
