= Sedley Cudmore =

Canadian economist, academic and civil servant

Sedley Anthony Cudmore (November 27, 1878 to October 17, 1945) was a Canadian economist, academic, civil servant and Canada's second Dominion Statistician.

== Early years ==
Cudmore was born in County Cork, Ireland. At age 9 he and his family immigrated to Canada.

In 1899 he attended the University of Toronto under the Prince of Wales matriculation scholarship, taking Classics and English. He continued his studies at Wadham College, Oxford, England, in history and economics earning a B.A and later an M.A degree.

He worked briefly for London newspapers and was, for a short period, a sub-editor on the London Standard. After he returned to Canada in 1908, he spent several years as a professor of Political Economy at the University of Toronto.

== Career at the Dominion Bureau of Statistics (DBS) ==
He started working for the Dominion Bureau of Statistics in 1919 as editor of the Canada Year Book and head of the General Statistics Branch. In 1935, Cudmore was selected by the British government to establish a central statistical office in Jerusalem, where he remained for three years. When Robert H. Coats retired in 1942, Cudmore became the new Dominion Statistician, after having served as Assistant Dominion Statistician since 1939.

== Honours ==
In 1944, the University of Toronto conferred on Cudmore an honorary Doctor of Laws in recognition of his distinguished services.

== Publications ==
=== Books ===
- Course of Instruction in Applied Economics (Toronto, Shaw Schools, Ltd., 1925).
- History of the World's Commerce, with Special Reference to Canada (rev. ed., London, Pitman, 1929; Toronto, Pitman, 1930).

=== Articles ===
- Commercial Policy and the Development of Commerce (in Cambridge History of the British Empire, vol. VI, pt. ii, Canada, c. 26, pp. 642–55).
- Constitution and Government of Canada (in Canada Year Book, 1921). Also issued as a reprint Provincial and Local Government in Canada. "Government Debts" (in The Canadian Economy and its Problems, Innis, H. A. and Plumptre, A. F. W., eds., Toronto, Canadian Institute of International Affairs, 1934, pp. 62–4).
- Primary and Secondary Education in Canada (Annals of the American Academy of Political and Social Science, vol. CVII, May, 1923, pp. 120–5).
- Some Personal Impressions of a Canadian Official at Jerusalem (The Institute Journal, vol. XVII, no. 8, Oct., 1938, pp. 217–23).
- Special Wartime Activities of a Central Statistical Bureau (Estadistica, vol. I, nos. 1, 2, March, June, 1943, pp. 183–4; 127–30).
- Statistical Activities of Canada (in Statistical Activity of the American Nations 1940, Phelps, Elizabeth, ed., Washington, Inter American Institute, 1941, pp. 127–64).
- War Obligations of Institute Members (The Institute Journal, vol. XX, no. 3, March, 1941, pp. 33–4).
- What the Institute Means to Me (The Institute Journal, vol. XXII, no. 9, Nov., 1943, pp. 193–4).
- Rural and Urban Composition of the Canadian Population (in collaboration with H. G. Caldwell, in Seventh Census of Canada, 1931, vol. 13, monographs, pp. 441–533). Also issued as a reprint.

== Death ==
Cudmore died suddenly on October 17, 1945, at age 66, while attending the first conference of the United Nations' Food and Agriculture Organization in Québec City. During his brief term in office, Cudmore laid the foundation for the modernization of the DBS programs and management.
