= Robert H. Coats =

Canadian statistician (1874-1960)

Robert Hamilton Coats

Robert Hamilton Coats (July 25, 1874 – February 7, 1960) was Canada's first Dominion Statistician.

He was born in Clinton, Huron County, Ontario in 1874, the son of Robert Coats, who came to Canada from Scotland. In 1896, Coats received a B.A. from University College in the University of Toronto. He worked as a journalist for The Toronto World and then the Toronto Globe until 1902 when, at the request of Prime Minister Mackenzie King, he became editor of the Labour Gazette; King himself had been the first editor of this publication which included statistical information related to labour.

Coats was named Chief Statistician for the Department of Labour in 1905. In 1915, he was appointed Dominion Statistician and Controller of the Census. Coats helped establish the Dominion Bureau of Statistics, now Statistics Canada.

He also served on statistical committees with the League of Nations. After he retired in 1942, Coats served as statistical advisor to the government of Ontario and the United Nations. He served four years as visiting professor of statistics in the Department of Political Economy at the University of Toronto.

Coats, one of the first residents of Rockcliffe Park, died in Ottawa at the age of 85. He had been married twice, first to Marie Hollbeister, and then, after his first wife's death, to Maida Skelly.

The R. H. Coats Building in Ottawa was named after him.
