= Walter E. Duffett =

Walter Elliot Duffett (1910, Toronto - 1982), was the last Dominion Statistician and the first Chief Statistician of Canada when the role changed following reforms in the government of Canada in 1971. He studied in Canada and London before working in the investment securities industry. However, in 1942 he joined the Wartime Prices and Trade Board. He moved on to a research role at the Bank of Canada. After a senior role in the Department of Labour, he was appointed Dominion Statistician in 1957. This was a role he held up to its transformation shortly before his retirement in 1972. He was responsible for the introduction of computers to the Dominion Bureau of Statistics.
