= Martin Wilk =

Canadian statistician (1922–2013)

Chief Statistician of Canada
- In office 1980–1985
- Preceded by: James L. Fry (interim)
- Succeeded by: Ivan Fellegi

Personal details
- Born: 18 December 1922 Montreal, Quebec, Canada
- Died: 19 February 2013 (aged 90) Yorba Linda, California
- Education: McGill University; Iowa State University

Martin Bradbury Wilk, OC (18 December 1922 – 19 February 2013) was a Canadian statistician, academic, and the former chief statistician of Canada. In 1965, together with Samuel Shapiro, he developed the Shapiro–Wilk test, which can indicate whether a sample of numbers would be unusual if it came from a Gaussian distribution. With Ramanathan Gnanadesikan he developed a number of important graphical techniques for data analysis, including the Q–Q plot and P–P plot.

== Education and career ==
Born in Montreal, Quebec, he received a bachelor of engineering degree in chemical engineering from McGill University in 1945. From 1945 to 1950, he was a research chemical engineer on the Atomic Energy Project at the National Research Council of Canada. From 1951 to 1955, he was a research associate, instructor, and assistant professor at Iowa State University, where he received a Master of Science in statistics in 1953 and a Ph.D. in statistics in 1955 under the supervision of Oscar Kempthorne. From 1955 to 1957, he was a research associate and assistant director of the Statistical Techniques Research Group at Princeton University. From 1959 to 1963, he was a professor and director of research in statistics at Rutgers University.

In 1956, he joined Bell Telephone Laboratories and in 1970 joined American Telephone and Telegraph Company. From 1976 to 1980, he was the assistant vice president-director of corporate planning. From 1980 to 1985, he was the chief statistician of Canada.

In 1981, he was appointed an adjunct professor of statistics at Carleton University.

In 1962 he was elected as a Fellow of the American Statistical Association. In 1999, he was made an Officer of the Order of Canada for his "insightful guidance on important matters related to our country's national statistical system".

== See also ==
- Wilk – people with the surname Wilk
