= List of economic regions of California =

Economic regions of California

Nine California regional economies and nine associated geopolitical regions were specified in about 1998 by the California Regional Economies Project. California Statewide is the tenth economic region. The California Economic Strategy Panel uses employment and wage information reported by employers, along with these regions, for public policy-making, planning, and program administration. Other agencies, specifically including the California Public Utilities Commission and the California Board of Registered Nursing, also provide reports for the regions.

== List ==
- Northern California Region (dark green)
- Northern Sacramento Valley Region (Light Green)
- Greater Sacramento (yellow)
- Bay Area (Red)
- Central Coast (orange)
- San Joaquin Valley Region (green)
- Central Sierra Region (brown)
- Southern California Region (light blue)
- Southern Border Region (purple)
- California Statewide. The state as a whole is the tenth economic region.

== See also ==
- Economy of California
- List of regions of California

== Bibliography ==
- "California Economic Strategy Panel Regions" (PDF). California Labor and Workforce Development Agency. Archived from the original (PDF) on October 1, 2011.
- "Economic Strategy Panel. California's Economic Regions". California Labor and Workforce Development Agency. Archived from the original on 2011-06-27.
- "Economic Strategy Panel". California Labor and Workforce Development Agency. Archived from the original on 2011-07-11.
