= Ivan Fellegi =

Hungarian-Canadian statistician

Ivan Fellegi OC
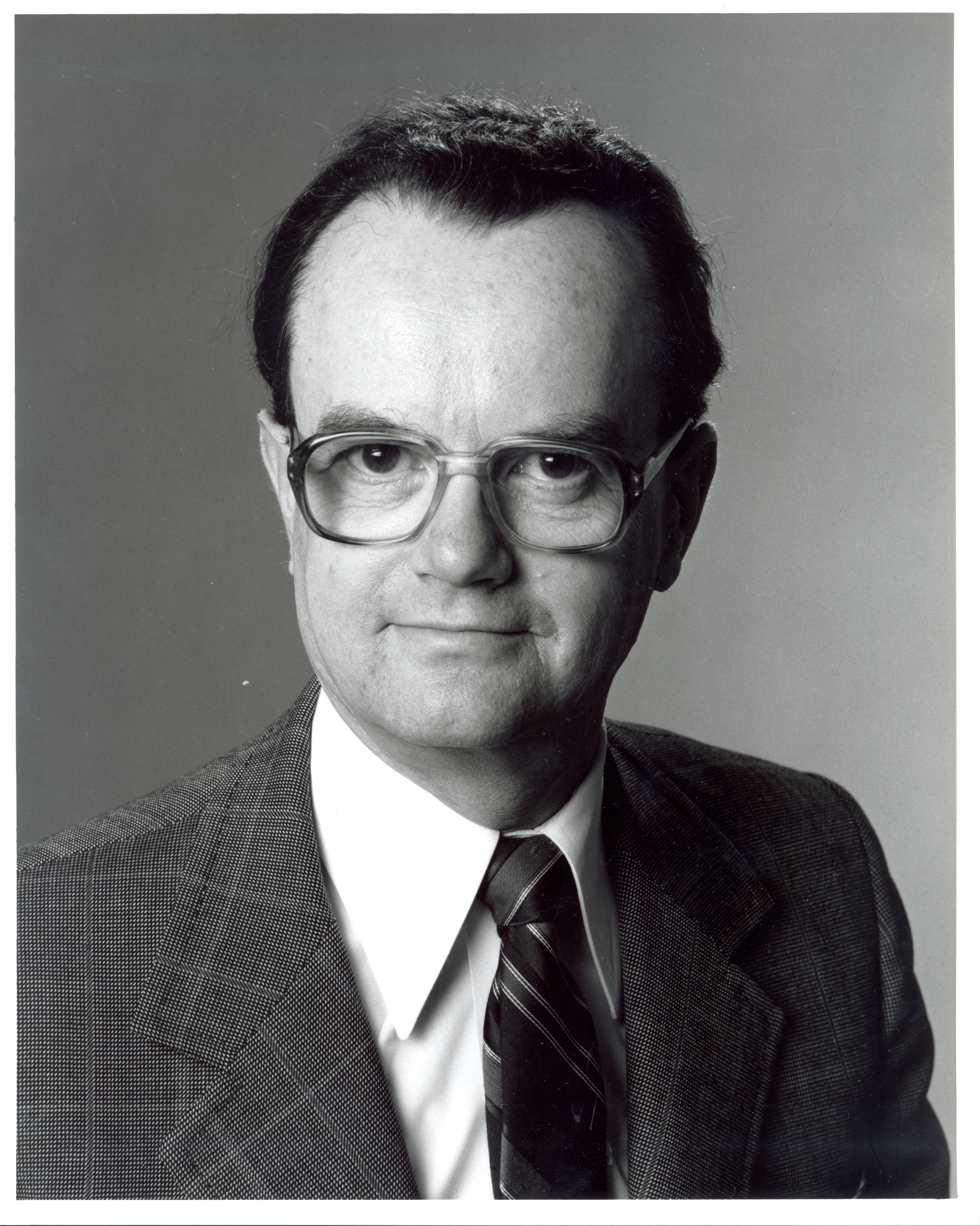
- Official portrait, 1985

Chief Statistician of Canada
- In office 1985–2008
- Preceded by: Martin Wilk
- Succeeded by: Munir Sheikh

Deputy Chief Statistician of Canada
- In office 1984–1985

Personal details
- Born: June 22, 1935 (age 91) Szeged, Hungary
- Education: University of Budapest (B.Sc.); Carleton University (M.Sc., Ph.D.)
- Awards: Médaille de la Ville de Paris (échelon Vermeil, 1989); Order of Canada (Member, 1992); Gold Medal by the Statistical Society of Canada (1997); Robert Schuman Medal by the European Community (1997); Order of Canada (Officer, 1998); Outstanding Achievement Award of the Public Service of Canada (2002); Career Achievement Award of the Canadian Policy Research Initiative (2002); Office of the Commissioner of Official Languages Leadership Award (2002); Order of Merit of the Hungarian Republic (2004); Outstanding Career Award of the Public Service of Canada (2017); Outstanding Service Award of Statistics Canada (2017)

Ivan Peter Fellegi, OC (Hungarian: Fellegi Péter Iván; born June 22, 1935) is a Hungarian-Canadian statistician and researcher who was the Chief Statistician of Canada from 1985 to 2008.

Fellegi has been the president of the International Statistical Institute, an honorary member of the Statistical Society of Canada, and an honorary fellow of the Royal Statistical Society among other associations. Fellegi has authored academic and research papers about various aspects of statistics, probability, mathematics, the social and economic implications of statistics, and the successful management of statistical organizations. Fellegi has been honored with numerous awards and accolades, including six honorary doctorates, the Order of Canada, the Order of Merit of the Hungarian Republic, Career Achievement Award of the Canadian Policy Research Initiative, and the Outstanding Achievement Award of the Public Service of Canada. Since 2008, he has been the Chief Statistician Emeritus at Statistics Canada, where he continues to maintain an office today.

== Early life ==
Born in Szeged, Hungary, Fellegi was working his way to complete mathematical studies at the Eötvös Loránd University when the Hungarian Uprising was crushed in 1956. When Fellegi was 21 years old, his mother arranged for a sympathetic physician to label her son a tuberculosis patient so that he could travel to the border area near Austria, ostensibly to receive treatment. Unfortunately, the pre-arranged smugglers were unavailable but several local teenagers, aided by a local woodcutter, agreed to lead him and his cousin to safety away from the Russian patrols. The pair trekked the mountains through cover of darkness until they made it to safety at the Austrian border. Shortly thereafter, Fellegi arrived in Ottawa, Ontario, Canada, to join his elder sister and soon began working for Statistics Canada (then known as the Dominion Bureau of Statistics).

In 1957, Fellegi completed his studies with night courses at Carleton University, in spite of being a new refugee without access to his Bachelor of Science transcripts. In 1958, he became the first Carleton University student to receive a Master of Science degree. Upon completing his doctoral studies in mathematical statistics in 1961, he became Carleton's first Ph.D. graduate. As there was no curriculum for his program at the time, his studies were largely self-guided.

While mathematical statistics became his lifeblood, Fellegi's first love was literature and poetry. At the age of 14, he became the youngest member of the Hungarian Writers' Association. He changed the trajectory of his studies when he was about to take entrance exams for university. Counter to his professors' recommendations, he decided that mathematics was factual and far less open to interpretation than literature, so in 1953, he opted to take the mathematics entrance exam and placed in the top five scores nationally.

== Career ==
In 1957, Fellegi was hired as a statistician at Statistics Canada, despite having not yet mastered English or French or being a Canadian citizen. In 1962, Fellegi was appointed Director of Sampling Research and Consultation Section, and in 1965, he was appointed Director of Sampling Research and Consultation Staff, before becoming Director General of the Methodology and Systems Branch in 1971. He was promoted to Assistant Chief Statistician in 1973 and became Deputy Chief Statistician in 1984.

While at Statistics Canada, two of Fellegi's research papers, "A Theory for Record Linkage" (1969) and "A Systematic Approach to Automatic Edit and Imputation" (1973), earned the distinction of becoming 2 of the 19 landmark papers in survey sampling published between 1934 and 1990.

As an Assistant Chief Statistician, he took leave without pay in 1978 to work for the United States Commission on the Reorganization of the US Statistical System as established by President Jimmy Carter.

On September 1, 1985, with close to 30 years experience, Fellegi was appointed Chief Statistician of Canada. Statistics Canada is widely regarded as one of the best statistical agencies in the world and, under his leadership, received that recognition in 1991 and again in 1993 from The Economist magazine. Fellegi announced his retirement as Chief Statistician on February 15, 2008, after 23 years at the helm of the agency. He continues to serve Canada voluntarily as the Chief Statistician Emeritus.

Fellegi served as the Chairman of the Board of Governors of Carleton University from 1995 to 1997.

Internationally, he chaired the Conference of European Statisticians of the United Nations Economic Commission for Europe from 1993 to 1997 and was the inaugural chairman of the Statistics Committee of the Organisation for Economic Cooperation and Development (OECD). As such, he played a key role in coordinating the (overlapping) mandates of the OECD Statistics Committee and the Conference of European Statisticians. At different periods of his career, he served as President of the International Statistical Institute, the International Association of Survey Statisticians, and the Statistical Society of Canada. He contributed to a number of international statistical projects, including work on the United States Census through the National Academy of Sciences.

Fellegi provided advice on statistical matters to his native Hungary following its transition to democracy, and in 2004 he was awarded the Order of Merit of the Republic of Hungary. He was also asked to review the statistical systems of Switzerland and Portugal.

Fellegi has been recognized in Canada and around the world for his extensive contributions to the field of statistics and public service. In 1965, he was elected as a Fellow of the American Statistical Association. In 1992, he was made a Member of the Order of Canada and was later promoted to Officer in 1998. He is an Honorary Member of the International Statistical Institute and an Honorary Fellow of the Royal Statistical Society, a Member of the Hungarian Academy of Sciences, and a Fellow of the American Association for the Advancement of Science.

He has been awarded the Gold Medal of the Statistical Society of Canada (1997), the Robert Schuman Medal by the European Community (1997), La Médaille de la ville de Paris (1999), the Outstanding Achievement Award of the Public Service of Canada (2002), the Office of the Commission of Official Languages Leadership Award (2002), the Career Achievement Award of the Canadian Policy Research Initiative (2002), the Outstanding Career Award from the Public Service of Canada (2017), and the Outstanding Service Award of Statistics Canada (2017).

As Chief Statistician Emeritus of Canada, Fellegi continues to lend his expertise and provide advice and guidance to Statistics Canada staff.

== Personal life ==
Fellegi attributes much of his success to the love and support of his family, including his wife of many years, Marika Fellegi, and their two daughters, both of whom have gone on to become successful medical professionals in their own right.

== Titles and memberships ==
- Honorary Fellow, Royal Statistical Society
- Fellow, American Statistical Association
- Fellow, American Association for the Advancement of Science
- Vice-President, International Statistical Institute (1977-1981)
- President, Statistical Society of Canada (1982)
- President, International Association of Survey Statisticians (1985-1987)
- President Elect, International Statistical Institute (1985-1987)
- President, International Statistical Institute (1987-1989)
- Member, Board of Governors, Carleton University (1989-1992)
- Honorary Member, International Statistical Institute (1993)
- Chair, Conference of European Statisticians for the United Nations Economic Commission for Europe (1993-1997)
- Chair, Board of Governors, Carleton University (1995-1997)
- Member of the Hungarian Academy of Sciences (2004)
- Honorary Member, Statistical Society of Canada (2008)

== Honorary doctorates ==
- Honorary Doctorate of Law, Simon Fraser University (1995)
- Honorary Doctorate of Law, McMaster University (1997)
- Honorary Doctorate of Science, Carleton University (1999)
- Honorary Doctorate, Université du Québec (2001)
- Honorary Doctorate, Université de Montréal (2002)
- Honorary Doctorate, University of Ottawa (2008)

== Selected publications ==
- "The Organisation of Statistical Methodology and Methodological Research in National Statistical Offices." Survey Methodology 36, no. 2 (2010).
- "The Effectiveness of a Supranational Statistical Office: Pluses, Minuses, and Challenges Viewed from the Outside." Journal of Official Statistics 21, no. 2 (2005). Co-authored with Jacob Ryten.
- "Maintaining the Credibility of Official Statistics." Statistical Journal of the United Nations Economic Commission for Europe 21, no. 3-4 (2004).
- “Official Statistics – Pressures and Challenges. ISI President’s Invited Lecture, 2003” International Statistical Review 72, no. 1 (2004).
- "Monitoring the Performance of a National Statistical Institute (NSI)." Statistical Journal of the United Nations Economic Commission for Europe 16, no. 4 (1999). Co-authored with Gordon Brackstone.
- "Statistical Services – Preparing for the Future." In Remembrances of the Joint Conference IASS/IAOS, Mexico, 1998. National Institute of Statistics, Geography and Informatics.
- "Towards Systems of Social Statistics." In Bulletin of the International Statistical Institute. Proceedings of the 51st Session, Istanbul, 1997. Co-authored with Michael Wolfson.
- "Characteristics of an Effective Statistical System." International Statistical Review/Revue Internationale de la Statistique 64, no. 2 (1996).
- "Discussion: Rust, K. F., Continuous Measurement Alternatives to Decennial Enumeration." In Proceedings of the Section on Survey Research Methods: Annual Meeting of the American Statistical Association, Toronto, August 13–18, 1994. Alexandria, VA: American Statistical Association.
- "Statistical Statesmanship in Official Statistics." In Proceedings of the Government Statistics Section: Annual Meeting of the American Statistical Association, Toronto, August 13–18, 1994. Alexandria, VA: American Statistical Association.
- "Discussion: Tortora, R. D., Miskura, S. M., and Dillman, D. A., Onwards Towards a 2000 Census Design: Research Results." In Proceedings of the Section on Survey Research Methods: Annual Meeting of the American Statistical Association, San Francisco, August 8–12, 1993. Alexandra, VA: American Statistical Association.
- "Comment: Freedman and Navidi: Should We Have Adjusted the Census of 1980?" Survey Methodology Journal 18, no. 1 (1992).
- "Planning and Priority Setting – The Canadian Experience." In Statistics in the Democratic Process at the End of the 20th Century: Anniversary Publication for the 40th Plenary Session of the Conference of European Statisticians. Wiesbaden: Federal Statistical Office, Federal Republic of Germany, 1992.
- "Maintaining Public Confidence in Official Statistics." Journal of the Royal Statistical Society. Series A (Statistics in Society) 154, no. 1 (1991).
- "Marketing at Statistics Canada." Statistical Journal of the United Nations Economic Commission for Europe 8, no. 3-4 (1991).
- “Can We Afford an Aging Society?" Canadian Economic Observer 1, no. 4 (1988).
- “Is Statistics Singular or Plural?” The Canadian Journal of Statistics 16, issue S1 (1988). Co-authored with Martin B. Wilk.
- "Evaluation Programme of the 1976 Census of Population and Housing-A Sampling." Journal of the Royal Statistical Society. Series D (The Statistician) 29, no. 4 (1980).
- "Should the Census Count Be Adjusted for Allocation Purposes? – Equity Considerations." In Proceedings of the 1980 Conference on Census Undercount, Arlington, VA., February 1980. Washington D.C.: U.S. Bureau of the Census.
- "Approximate Tests of Independence and Goodness of Fit Based on Stratified Multi-Stage Samples." Survey Methodology 4, no. 1 (1978).
- "An Application of Functional Analysis – Current Trends in Statistics Canada." Conference of European Statisticians, June 27-July 1, 1977. Co-authored with Jacob Ryten.
- “Anticipated Computer Hardware and Software Developments and their Relevance to Statistical Offices.” In Report of a Seminar of the Conference of European Statisticians: Statistical Services in Ten Years’ Time, Washington D.C., March 21–25, 1977. Oxford: Pergamon Press. Co-authored with Edvard Outrata.
- "Functional Analysis of an 'Ideal' Statistical System." In Report of a Seminar of the Conference of European Statisticians: Statistical Services in Ten Years’ Time, Washington D.C., March 21–25, 1977. Oxford: Pergamon Press.
- "A Systematic Approach to Automatic Edit and Imputation." Journal of the American Statistical Association 71, no. 353 (1976). Co-authored with David Holt.
- "Automatic Editing and Imputation of Quantitative Data." Meeting of the International Association of Survey Statisticians, Warsaw, September 1–9, 1975.
- "Sorcerer's Apprentice: Data-processing Issues as seen by Management." Annual Meeting of the Data Processing Institute, 1975.
- "An Improved Method of Estimating the Correlated Response Variance." Journal of the American Statistical Association 69, no. 346 (1974).
- Some Aspects of the Survey Design for the Moroccan Dual Record Experimental Study. International Program of Laboratories for Population Statistics, Department of Biostatistics, Carolina Population Center, University of North Carolina at Chapel Hill, 1974.
- "Some Thoughts on Editing and Correction of Survey Data." In Proceedings of the Symposium on Statistics and Related Topics, Ottawa, October 24–26, 1974. Ottawa: Carleton University.
- "Statistical Confidentiality: Some Theory and Applications to Data Dissemination." Annals of Economic and Social Measurement 3, no. 2 (1974). Co-authored with John L. Philips.
- "A Systematic Approach to Automatic Edit and Imputation." In Bulletin of the International Statistical Institute. Contributed Papers: 39th Session of the International Statistical Institute, Vienna, August 20–30, 1973. Co-authored with David Holt.
- "Balance between Different Sources of Survey Errors – Some Canadian Experiences." In Bulletin of the International Statistical Institute. Proceedings of the 39th Session, Vienna, August 20–30, 1973. Co-authored with Alan B. Sunter.
- "The evaluation of the accuracy of survey results: some Canadian experiences." International Statistical Review/Revue Internationale de Statistique 41, no. 1 (1973).
- "On the question of statistical confidentiality." Journal of the American Statistical Association 67, no. 337 (1972).
- "Sampling Errors in Periodic Surveys." In Proceedings of the Social Statistics Section: Annual Meeting of the American Statistical Association, Colorado, August 23–26, 1971. Washington D.C.: American Statistical Association. Co-authored with G. B. Gray.
- "Statistical Data Banks in the Canadian Government and their Use." In Bulletin of the International Statistical Institute. Proceedings of the 38th Session, Washington,1971. Co-authored with J. Vander Noot.
- "The Computer and Government Statistics." In The Role of the Computer in Economic and Social Research in Latin America: A Conference Report of the National Bureau of Economic Research, Cuernavaca, Mexico, October 25–29, 1971. New York: National Bureau of Economic Research.
- "Micro Data Sets, Simulation and Statistical Systems." Brookings Institution Workshop on Micro Data Sets, Washington D.C., October 22–23, 1970. Co-authored with Simon A. Goldberg, Jenny R. Podoluk, and T. Gigantes.
- "A theory for record linkage." Journal of the American Statistical Association 64, no. 328 (1969). Co-authored with Alan B. Sunter.
- "Some Aspects of the Impact of Computers on Official Statistics." In Bulletin of the International Statistical Institute. Proceedings of the 37th Session, London, 1969. Co-authored with Simon A. Goldberg.
- "An Optimal Theory of Record Linkage." In Bulletin of the International Statistical Institute. Proceedings of the 36th Session, Sydney, 1967. Co-authored with Alan B. Sunter.
- "The New Design of the Canadian Labour Force Survey." Journal of the American Statistical Association 62, no. 318 (1967). Co-authored with G. B. Gray.
- "Computer Methods for Geographical Coding and Retrieval of Data in the Dominion Bureau of Statistics." In Proceedings of the Social Statistics Section: Annual Meeting of the American Statistical Association, Washington D.C., December 27–30, 1967. Washington D.C.: American Statistical Association. Co-authored with J. I. Weldon.
- "The Testing Programme for the 1971 Census of Canada." In Proceedings of the Social Statistics Section: Annual Meeting of the American Statistical Association, Washington D.C., December 27–30, 1967. Washington D.C.: American Statistical Association. Co-authored with Karol J. Krótki.
- "Changing the Probabilities of Selection when Two Units are Selected with Probabilities Proportional to Size without Replacement." Proceedings of the Social Statistics Section: Annual Meeting of the American Statistical Association, Los Angeles, August 15–19, 1966. Washington D.C.: American Statistical Association.
- "The Redesign of the Canadian Labour Force Survey." Proceedings of the Social Statistics Section: Annual Meeting of the American Statistical Association, Chicago, December 27–30, 1964. Washington D.C.: American Statistical Association. Co-authored with Richard Platek and G. B. Gray.
- "Response Variance and its Estimation." Journal of the American Statistical Association 59, no. 308 (1964).
- "Some Sampling Techniques Applied by the Dominion Bureau of Statistics." Estadistica 21, no. 80 (1963).
- "Sampling with Varying Probabilities without Replacement: Rotating and Non-rotating Samples." Journal of the American Statistical Association 58, no. 301 (1963).
- "An Analysis of Response Variance." In Bulletin of the International Statistical Institute. Proceedings of the 34th Session, Ottawa, 1963. Toronto: University of Toronto Press.
