= Institute on Governance =

Canadian think tank

- Institut sur la gouvernance
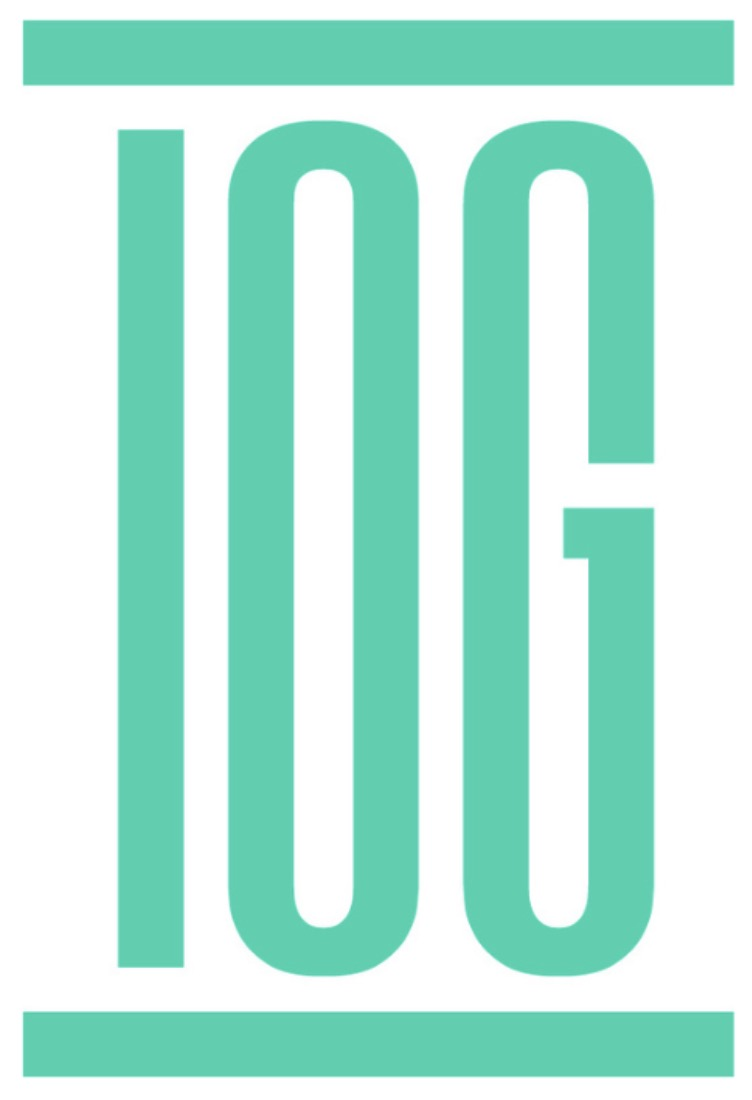
- Abbreviation: IOG
- Formation: 1990; 36 years ago
- Founder: Timothy Plumptre
- Type: Public policy think tank
- Legal status: Canadian Charity 132056631 RR 0001
- Headquarters: 60 George St, Ottawa, Ontario, Canada
- President and CEO: Allen Sutherland
- Chair of the Board: Malcolm Brown
- Staff: 20 (plus 30 associates)
- Website: iog.ca

The Institute on Governance (IOG) is a Canadian think-tank focused on developing better governance in the public sphere. The organisation also uses the French title, Institut sur la gouvernance. The IOG is a registered charity in Canada.

The institute is headquartered in Ottawa. Its mission is to advance better governance by exploring, developing and promoting the principles, standards and practices which underlie good governance in the public sphere.

== History ==
The IOG was founded in 1990 in Ottawa by Timothy Plumptre, who acted as director and president until 2007. Its budget was C$1.5 million and it counted 18 staff in 2003.

Maryantonett Flumian served as president between 2009 and 2018, during which time the IOG expanded domestically as well as overseas, including a multi-year project in Iraq.

Toby Fyfe was president from 2018-2023.

As of 2025, the president and CEO is Allen Sutherland. He manages roughly 20 staff plus 30 external associates. Sutherland frequently comments on public affairs in Canada.

== Governance ==
The IOG is a registered charity in Canada. It is governed by a Board of Directors currently chaired by Malcolm Brown.

== Sample services and products ==
The IOG provides services and products related to good governance. Examples:

- Advice: Resilient Institutions: Learning from Canada’s COVID-19 Pandemic
- Research: Principles for Good Governance in the 21st Century
- Convening: Redefining Work in the Public Service
- Courses: Executive Leadership Program
- Capacity-building: Governance Knowledge Hub
