= Chief Statistician of Canada =

Canadian public office position

- Statisticien en chef du Canada
- Incumbent; André Loranger since December 20, 2024
- Statistics Canada
- Member of: Public Service of Canada
- Reports to: Minister of Industry
- Appointer: Governor in Council
- Precursor: Dominion Statistician
- Inaugural holder: Robert H. Coats (as Dominion Statistician)
- Formation: 1918
- Website: www.statcan.gc.ca

The chief statistician of Canada (French: Statisticien en chef du Canada) is the senior public servant responsible for Statistics Canada (StatCan), an agency of the Government of Canada. The office is equivalent to that of a deputy minister and as a member of the public service, the position is nonpartisan.

The chief statistician advises on matters pertaining to statistical programs of the department and agencies of the government, supervises the administration of the Statistics Act, controls the operation and staff of StatCan and reports annually on the activities of StatCan to the minister of industry.

Since April 1, 2024, the role has been held by André Loranger.

== Dominion statisticians and chief statisticians of Canada (1918 to present) ==
Name	Period	Title
Robert H. Coats	1918–1942	Dominion Statistician
Sedley A. Cudmore	1942–1945	Dominion Statistician
Herbert Marshall	1945–1956	Dominion Statistician
Walter E. Duffett	1957–1972	Dominion Statistician/Chief Statistician
Sylvia Ostry	1972–1975	Chief Statistician
Peter G. Kirkham	1975–1980	Chief Statistician
James L. Fry	1980	Interim Chief Statistician
Martin B. Wilk	1980–1985	Chief Statistician
Ivan P. Fellegi	1985–2008	Chief Statistician
Munir Sheikh	2008–2010	Chief Statistician
Wayne Smith	2010	Interim Chief Statistician
Wayne Smith	2011–2016	Chief Statistician
Anil Arora	2016–2024	Chief Statistician
André Loranger	2024	Interim Chief Statistician
André Loranger	2024–present	Chief Statistician
