= Census in Canada =

National census every five years

Statistics Canada conducts a national census of population and census of agriculture every five years and releases the data with a two-year lag. The last census conducted in Canada occurred in 2026 while the next is scheduled for 2031.

The Census of Population provides demographic and statistical data that is used to plan public services such as health care, education, and transportation; determine federal transfer payments; and determine the number of Members of Parliament for each province and territory. The Census of Population is the primary source of sociodemographic data for specific population groups, such as lone-parent families, Indigenous peoples, immigrants, seniors and language groups. Data from the census is also used to assess the economic state of the country, including the economic conditions of immigrants over time, and labour market activity of communities and specific populations. Census data are also leveraged to develop socioeconomic status indicators in support of analysis of various impacts on education achievement and outcomes. At a sub-national level, two provinces (Alberta and Saskatchewan) and two territories (Nunavut and Yukon) have legislation that allows local governments to conduct their own municipal censuses.

The Census of Population gathers important data on a variety of topics, including:

- Indigenous peoples
- Education, training and learning
- Ethnic diversity and immigration
- Families, households and housing
- Income, pensions, spending and wealth
- Labour
- Languages
- Population and demography

There have been questions about religion in Canada in the national census since 1871. In 1951, when the frequency of conducting the national census changed from being collected every 10 years to every 5 years, questions about religion were still asked only every 10 years.

The census typically undercounts the population by ~2–4% because people are not at home, people have trouble understanding the census, or census enumerators are unable to find the people.

== History ==
The first census in what is now Canada took place in New France in 1666, under the direction of Intendant Jean Talon. The census noted the age, sex, marital status and occupation of 3,215 inhabitants.

French-controlled Acadia also took their own census from 1671 to 1755.

It is notable that section 8 of the Constitution Act, 1867 mandates that a national census must be done every 10 years, on years ending in 1 (1871, 1881, 1891, etc.). However, the section has been interpreted to mean that a census cannot be conducted beyond that 10-year period, but this does not indicate that a census cannot be conducted more regularly—such as every 5 years, as is now required of Statistics Canada by the Statistics Act.

The first national census of Canada was taken in 1871, as required by section 8 of the then British North America Act, 1867 (now the Constitution Act, 1867). Parliament implemented the requirements of the constitution through the Census Act of May 12, 1870. All inhabitants of Canada were surveyed, including Indigenous peoples. While this was the first national census, only the four provinces that were part of the Dominion of Canada at the time—Ontario, Quebec, New Brunswick and Nova Scotia—were included in the census. Other areas that would later become part of Canada continued to be enumerated with their own separate censuses. The results of the 1871 census were reported in a five-volume set in 1873, in both English and French.

In 1881, the governing legislation was amended to require census takers to take an oath of secrecy. By this time, Prince Edward Island, Manitoba, and British Columbia were part of Canada and included in the national census, as was the Northwest Territories.

Beginning in 1906, the Prairie provinces of Manitoba, Alberta and Saskatchewan began to take separate censuses of population and agriculture every five years to monitor growth in the West. After becoming part of Canada in 1949, Newfoundland (including Labrador) has been included in the Canadian census since 1951. Since 1956, the Census of Agriculture and the Census of Population have been taken together every five years across the entire country.

In 1912, the federal government transferred responsibility for conducting the census from the Ministry of Agriculture to the Ministry of Trade and Commerce. In 1918, the government established the Dominion Bureau of Statistics, which was renamed Statistics Canada in 1971. Statistics Canada continues to be responsible for the census.

== Accessibility, disclosure, and publication ==
All census records prior to and including the 1931 census are publicly available at Library and Archives Canada (LAC). Bill S-18, An Act to Amend the Statistics Act, received Royal Assent on June 18, 2005. The act creates section 18.1 of the Statistics Act, which releases personal census records to LAC for censuses taken between 1910 and 2005, inclusive, 92 years after the taking of a census. In the 2006 census, Canadians were asked for the first time whether they consent to the release of their personal census information after 92 years. This means that 2006 census records will be released to LAC in 2098 only for those respondents who consented to the release of their records. Census returns taken after 1926 are in the custody of Statistics Canada and disclosure of personal information from these records is not permitted. The only exception is for individuals who require information about themselves.

Statistics Canada has implemented stringent procedures to protect the confidentiality of census information per the Statistics Act, such as requiring employees be sworn to secrecy when they are hired, and limiting access to personal and confidential information to those with a need to know to complete their work. Questionnaires completed online are protected through a number of measures, including a secure login process and encryption between the user's browser and Statistics Canada's servers. Census data are processed and stored on a highly restricted internal network.

The Census of Population Program enables the production and publication of many free resources to the public, including, but not limited to, data products, reference materials, geographical information and data visualization tools released within two years after a census is conducted.

== Highlights ==
Highlights of the census history in Canada include:

• 1666 – The first Canadian census was taken in New France by Intendant Jean Talon. The recorded population (excluding Indigenous peoples and royal troops) was 3,215. Information was collected on age, sex, marital status and locality. In addition, the census identified professions and trades for 763 people.

• 1666 to 1867 – Numerous censuses were taken at irregular intervals in the colonies of France and Britain that became parts of Canada. Extant records held by Library and Archives Canada and commonly used for research include 1825, 1831, 1842, 1852, and 1861.

• 1867 – The Constitution Act, 1867 (formerly the British North America Act, 1867) included the requirement that a census must be taken every 10 years (decennially) to determine representation by population in the new parliament.

• 1871 – The first decennial census was taken in this year. The census enumerated the population of the four original provinces (Nova Scotia, New Brunswick, Quebec and Ontario). Manitoba and British Columbia, which had also joined Confederation, were surveyed separately. For the first time, questions on religion and birthplace were asked in the census.

The 1871 census was the first to use the de jure method of enumeration rather than the de facto method used in Europe both then and now. The de facto method enumerates people where they are found on Census Day. The de jure method enumerates people according to their usual place of residence.

• 1881 – All census enumerators were required to take an oath of secrecy—a pledge still required today. The census was extended to include British Columbia, Manitoba and Prince Edward Island.

• 1891 – The population was prepared for the census enumerator's visit through announcements in newspapers and from pulpits.

• 1896 – A mid-decade census was held in Manitoba beginning in 1896 and then in Saskatchewan and Alberta beginning in 1906. These censuses were needed to measure the rapid growth taking place in the West.

• 1901 – Census content was expanded to include citizenship and period of immigration.

• 1905 – The census office became a permanent bureau of the federal government.

• 1906 – Beginning in 1906, the federal government took separate census of population and agriculture in the three prairie provinces of Manitoba, Alberta, and Saskatchewan every five years to monitor the growth of the West.

• 1912 – Responsibility for conducting the census was transferred from the former Ministry of Agriculture to the former Ministry of Trade and Commerce.

• 1918 – The Dominion Bureau of Statistics was created.

• 1921 – The Sixth Census of Canada (1921) was the first national census to collect data on the type of tenure (owner vs tenant) for Canadian households.

• 1931 – Even though compilation and tabulation for the 1931 census were still carried out with mechanical equipment, a new sorter-tabulator developed by an employee of the Dominion Bureau of Statistics made production 50 times faster by allowing a whole data card to be read at once, rather than one column at a time.

• 1941 – Sample information was collected for the first time, meaning that 1 in 10 households were asked additional content about their dwelling (type, number of rooms, cooking fuel used, etc.).

• 1951 –The 1951 census, held two years after Newfoundland (including Labrador) became part of Canada, marked Canada's first census as a nation of 10 provinces and 2 territories. The 1951 census used “mark-sense.” This technology allowed punch cards to be generated, greatly reducing processing time and costs.

• 1956 – A quinquennial (every five years) Census of Population and Census of Agriculture was held in all provinces across the country, replacing the mid-decade censuses of the Prairie provinces.

• 1971 – Under the Statistics Act of 1971, the Dominion Bureau of Statistics was renamed Statistics Canada. The act also confirmed that a Census of Population and a Census of Agriculture would be taken every five years (quinquennially).

Self-enumeration was first introduced in 1971. With the exception of Indigenous reserves and remote areas where canvassing was deemed necessary due to logistical reasons and other limitations, census questionnaires and completion instructions were dropped off at private homes and respondents were asked to complete their own questionnaires. In population centres of 10,000 people or more, respondents were asked to mail their completed questionnaires back in a pre-addressed envelope. In other areas, questionnaires were picked up by census enumerators.

• 1991 – All respondents in self-enumeration areas (over 98% of the population) were asked to return their completed census questionnaires by mail. The final return rate was 85%, and 27 million people in over 10 million households were counted. Information on common-law partners was also collected for the first time.

• 2001 – For the first time, data were collected on same-sex couples.

• 2006 – Census questionnaires were delivered by Canada Post to about 70% of households. The remaining 30% received the questionnaire from an enumerator, as in previous censuses. For the first time, all Canadians could answer the census questionnaire online. This was received positively by Canadians. Nationally, 18.5% of Canadian households completed their questionnaire online. This was also the first time people were asked if they agreed to have their personal information released in 92 years for the purposes of research and education. Respondents were also asked whether they would give Statistics Canada permission to access their tax files. This permission was sought in an effort to reduce response burden. The definition of spouse was expanded to include same-sex married couples.

• 2011 – The response to the online option in 2006 prompted a major change in methodology for the 2011 census. In May, a letter was delivered to 60% of Canadian dwellings. This letter replaced the traditional paper questionnaire and explained how respondents could complete the questionnaire online. About 20% of dwellings received a questionnaire package by mail. For the remaining 20%, questionnaires were dropped off by enumerators. Information previously collected by the mandatory long-form census questionnaire was collected as part of the new voluntary National Household Survey (NHS). The 2011 Census of Population questionnaire (short form) consisted of the same content as the 2006 census short-form questionnaire, with the addition of two questions on language.

• 2016 – In November 2015, the government reinstated the long-form census questionnaire, replacing the NHS. Most households (75%) received the short-form census questionnaire, while one in four households (25%) received the long-form questionnaire. The overall response at the end of collection for the 2016 census was 98.4%, including 68.4% of responses received online, placing Canada at the forefront internationally for internet collection on a census.

== See also ==
- Census geographic units of Canada
- Census division statistics of Canada
- Demographics of Canada
- Canadian Census of Agriculture
- Ethnic groups in Canada
- List of largest Canadian cities by census
- Population of Canada by year
