= List of acts of the Parliament of Canada =

This is an incomplete list of the continuing acts of the Parliament of Canada. Many of these acts have had one or more amending acts.

== 1867 – 1899 ==
- Customs Act, 1867
- Aliens and Naturalization Act, 1868
- Fisheries Act, 1868
- Gradual Enfranchisement Act, 1869
- Manitoba Act, 1870
- Bank Act, 1871
- Dominion Lands Act, 1872
- Parliament of Canada Act, 1875
- Supreme and Exchequer Courts Act, 1875
- Indian Act, 1876
- Canada Temperance Act, 1878
- Naturalization and Aliens Act, 1881
- Chinese Immigration Act, 1885
- Rocky Mountains Park Act, 1887
- Criminal Code, 1892
- Canada Evidence Act, 1893
- Quebec Boundary Extension Act, 1898

== 1900 – 1929 ==
- Alberta Act, 1905
- Saskatchewan Act' 1905
- Lord's Day Act, 1906
- Juvenile Delinquents Act, 1908
- Immigration Act, 1910
- Naval Service Act, 1910
- Quebec Boundaries Extension Act, 1912
- Finance Act, 1914
- Naturalization Act, 1914
- War Measures Act, 1914
- Income Tax Act, 1917 (originally known as The Income War Tax Act)
- Migratory Birds Convention Act, 1917
- Military Service Act, 1917
- Military Voters Act, 1917
- Wartime Elections Act, 1917
- Civil Service Act, 1918
- Statistics Act, 1918
- Women's Franchise Act 1918
- Canada Highways Act, 1919
- Dominion Elections Act, 1920
- Food and Drugs Act, 1920
- Canadian Nationals Act 1921
- Chinese Immigration Act, 1923
- Combines Investigation Act 1923
- National Defence Act, 1923

== 1930 – 1949 ==
- National Parks Act, 1930
- Natural Resources Acts, 1930
- Unemployment and Farm Relief Act, 1931
- Bank of Canada Act, 1934
- Public Works Construction Act, 1934
- Succession to the Throne Act, 1937
- National Housing Act, 1938
- National Resources Mobilization Act, 1940
- Family Allowance Act, 1945
- Canadian Citizenship Act, 1946
- Canadian Overseas Telecommunication Corporation Act, 1948

== 1950 – 1979 ==
- Canada Council for the Arts Act, 1957
- Hospital Insurance and Diagnostic Services Act, 1957
- Canadian Bill of Rights, 1960
- Narcotic Control Act, 1961
- Canada Labour Code, 1967
- Criminal Law Amendment Act, 1968–69
- Arctic Waters Pollution Prevention Act, 1970
- Standards Council of Canada Act 1970
- Consumer Packaging and Labeling Act, 1970
- Weights and Measures Act, 1970
- Divorce Act, 1968 - replaced by Divorce Act, 1985
- Canada Wildlife Act, 1973
- National Symbol of Canada Act, 1975
- Anti-Inflation Act 1975
- Immigration Act, 1976
- Canadian Human Rights Act, 1977
- Canadian Football Act 1974

== 1980 – 1989 ==
- Tax Court of Canada Act, 1980
- Privacy Act, 1982
- Access to Information Act, 1983
- Tax Court of Canada Act, 1983
- Western Grain Transportation Act, 1983
- Canada Health Act, 1984
- Foreign Extraterritorial Measures Act, 1984
- Young Offenders Act, 1984
- Asia Pacific Foundation of Canada Act, 1985
- Auditor General Act, 1985
- Canada Agricultural Products Act, 1985
- Divorce Act (R.S., 1985, c. 3 (2nd Supp.))
- Aeronautics Act, R.S. 1985
- Bankruptcy and Insolvency Act, 1985
- Canada Business Corporations Act, 1985
- Companies' Creditors Arrangement Act, 1985
- Criminal Records Act, 1985
- Lobbying Act, 1985
- Pest Control Products Act, 1985
- Radiocommunication Act, 1985
- Employment Equity Act, 1986
- Canada Agricultural Products Act, 1988
- Canadian Centre on Substance Abuse Act, 1988
- Canadian Multiculturalism Act, 1988
- Emergencies Act, 1988
- Heritage Railway Stations Protection Act, 1988
- Mutual Legal Assistance in Criminal Matters Act, 1988
- Official Languages Act, 1988

== 1990 – 1999 ==
- Canadian Space Agency Act, 1990
- Integrated Circuit Topography Act, 1990
- Broadcasting Act, 1991
- Bank Act, 1991
- Contraventions Act, 1992
- Transportation of Dangerous Goods Act, 1992, 1992
- Telecommunications Act, 1993
- Firearms Act 1995
- Controlled Drugs and Substances Act, 1996
- Oceans Act, 1996
- Winding-up and Restructuring Act, 1996
- Customs Tariff Act,, 1997
- Nuclear Safety and Control Act, S.C. 1997
- Tobacco Act, 1997
- Canada Marine Act, 1998
- DNA Identification Act, 1998
- Canadian Environmental Protection Act, 1999, 1999
- Clarity Act, 1999
- Corruption of Foreign Public Officials Act, 1999

== 2000 – 2009 ==
- Canada Elections Act, 2000
- Canada National Parks Act, 2000
- Crimes Against Humanity and War Crimes Act, 2000
- Personal Information Protection and Electronic Documents Act, 2000
- Canada Foundation for Sustainable Development Technology Act, 2001
- Immigration and Refugee Protection Act, 2001
- Proceeds of Crime (Money Laundering) and Terrorist Financing Act, 2001
- Anti-Terrorism Act, 2001
- Species at Risk Act, 2002
- Youth Criminal Justice Act, 2002
- Canadian Environmental Assessment Act, 2003
- An Act to amend the Criminal Code (protection of children and other vulnerable persons) and the Canada Evidence Act, 2004
- Assisted Human Reproduction Act, 2004
- International Transfer of Offenders Act, 2004
- Pledge to Africa Act, 2004
- Civil Marriage Act, 2005
- Quarantine Act
- Wage Earner Protection Program Act, 2005
- Federal Accountability Act, 2006
- Public Servants Disclosure Protection Act, 2007
- Veterans' Bill of Rights, 2007
- Heritage Lighthouse Protection Act, 2008
- Official Development Assistance Accountability Act,, 2008
- Tackling Violent Crime Act, 2008
- Electronic Commerce Protection Act, 2009

== 2010 – 2019 ==
- Canada Consumer Product Safety Act, 2010
- Fighting Internet and Wireless Spam Act, 2010
- Copyright Modernization Act, 2012
- Jobs, Growth and Long-term Prosperity Act, 2012
- Jobs and Growth Act, 2012, 2012
- Preventing Persons from Concealing Their Identity during Riots and Unlawful Assemblies Act, 2012
- Protecting Canada's Immigration System Act, 2012
- Safe Streets and Communities Act,, 2012
- Succession to the Throne Act, 2013, 2013
- Combating Terrorism Act, 2013
- Fair Elections Act, 2014
- Protecting Canadians from Online Crime Act, 2014
- Anti-terrorism Act, 2015, 2015
- An Act to amend the Canadian Human Rights Act and the Criminal Code, 2016
- Cannabis Act, 2018
- Tobacco and Vaping Products Act, 2018 (formerly the Tobacco Act)
- Accessible Canada Act, 2019
- Ending the Captivity of Whales and Dolphins Act, 2019
- Impact Assessment Act and Canadian Energy Regulator Act, 2019
- Oil Tanker Moratorium Act, 2019

== 2020 – present ==
- Preserving Provincial Representation in the House of Commons Act, 2022
- Online News Act, 2023
- Online Streaming Act, 2023
- Countering Foreign Interference Act, 2024
- One Canadian Economy Act, 2025
