= Pardon =

Forgiveness of a crime by the government

A pardon is a government decision to allow a person to be relieved of some or all of the legal consequences resulting from a criminal conviction. A pardon may be granted before or after conviction for the crime, depending on the laws of the jurisdiction.

Pardons can be viewed as a tool to overcome miscarriage of justice, allowing a grant of freedom to someone who is believed to be wrongly convicted or subjected to an excessive penalty. The second-best theory of pardons views pardons as second-best to fair justice. Pardons can be granted in many countries when individuals are deemed to have demonstrated that they have "paid their debt to society", or are otherwise considered to be deserving of them. In some jurisdictions of some nations, accepting a pardon may implicitly constitute an admission of guilt; the offer is refused in some cases. Cases of wrongful conviction are in recent times more often dealt with by appeal rather than by pardon; however, a pardon is sometimes offered when innocence is undisputed in order to avoid the costs that are associated with a retrial. Clemency plays a critical role when capital punishment exists in a jurisdiction.

Pardons can also be a source of controversy, such as when granted in what appears to be a political favor. The arbitrariness and limited political accountability of pardons have been criticized.

== By country ==
=== Australia ===
In Australia, the pardon power is referred to as the royal prerogative of mercy, an executive power that is vested in the King and may be exercised by the governor-general. The prerogative of mercy is a broad discretionary power that may be exercised by a state governor who is acting on the advice of the state executive council and the state attorney general. Courts in Australia may also exercise their traditional power to exercise mercy when the circumstances of the defendant or offense warrant relief.

In addition to the prerogative of mercy, Australia has passed legislation that creates additional avenues to seek a pardon, exoneration, reduced sentence, or conditional release.

=== Canada ===
==== Pardons ====
The Parole Board of Canada (PBC) is the federal agency responsible for making pardon decisions under the Criminal Records Act (CRA). Under the CRA, the PBC can issue, grant, deny, and revoke pardons.

In 2012, the Parliament of Canada passed the Safe Streets and Communities Act, which changed many elements of the criminal justice system. The Act replaced the term "pardon" with "record suspension", and the pardon system was similarly changed.

A pardon keeps the police record of a conviction separate and apart from other criminal records, and gives law-abiding citizens an opportunity to reintegrate into Canadian society.

The Royal Canadian Mounted Police removes all information about the conviction for which an individual received the pardon from the Canadian Police Information Centre (CPIC). Federal agencies cannot give out information about the conviction without approval from the minister of public safety.

A pardon does not, however, erase the fact that an individual was convicted of a crime. The criminal record is not erased, but it is kept separate and apart from other (non-pardoned) criminal records.

A pardon removes disqualifications caused by a criminal conviction, such as the ability to contract with the federal government, or eligibility for Canadian citizenship.

If an individual in receipt of a pardon is convicted of a new offence, the information may lead to a reactivation of the criminal record for which the pardon was received in CPIC.

A pardon does not guarantee entry or visa privileges to another country. Before travelling to another country, individuals must still contact the authorities of the country in question to find out what the requirements are to enter that country.

Processing of pardons by the Parole Board of Canada generally takes six months for a summary offence and twelve months for an indictable offence. If the Parole Board proposes to deny the application, it can take 24 months to process.

Individuals can apply for a pardon if they were convicted as an adult of a criminal offense in Canada, or of an offense under a federal act or regulation of Canada, or if they were convicted of a crime in another country and were transferred to Canada under the Transfer of Offenders Act or International Transfer of Offenders Act. Non-Canadian citizens are not eligible for a Canadian pardon unless they were convicted of a crime in Canada.

To be eligible for a pardon or record suspension, individuals must have completed all of their sentences and a waiting period.

Individuals are considered to have completed all of their sentences if they have:

- Paid all fines, surcharges, costs, restitution and compensation orders
- Served all sentences of imprisonment, conditional sentences, including parole or statutory release
- Completed their probation order

Prior to 2012, following completion of all of their sentences, individuals must have completed a waiting period, as follows:

- Three years for summary convictions under the Criminal Code or other federal act or regulation, except sexual crimes against children
- Three years under the National Defence Act, if fined $2,000 or less, detained or imprisoned six months or less, or subjected to various lesser punishments for a service offence
- Five years for indictable convictions under the Criminal Code or other federal act or regulation and summary convictions of sexual crimes against children
- Five years for all convictions by a Canadian offender transferred to Canada under the Transfer of Offenders Act or International Transfer of Offenders Act
- Five years under the National Defence Act, if you were fined more than $2,000, detained or imprisoned more than six months, or dismissed from service
- Ten years for indictable convictions for sexual crimes against children and criminals receiving more than two years of imprisonment time for "serious personal injury offence" such as manslaughter or other designated offence under section 752 of the Criminal Code.

Effective 13 March 2012, the eligibility criteria and waiting periods changed:

- Five years for summary convictions under the Criminal Code or other federal act or regulation, except sexual crimes against children
- Five years under the National Defence Act, if fined $2,000 or less, detained or imprisoned six months or less, or subjected to various lesser punishments for a service offence
- Ten years for indictable convictions under the Criminal Code or other federal act or regulation and summary convictions of sexual crimes against children
- Ten years for all convictions by a Canadian offender transferred to Canada under the Transfer of Offenders Act or International Transfer of Offenders Act
- Ten years under the National Defence Act, if fined more than $2,000, detained or imprisoned more than six months, or dismissed from service
- "Not Eligible" for indictable convictions for sexual crimes against children (Schedule 1 Offence under CRA)
- "Not Eligible" for criminals with more than three offences prosecuted by indictment, each with a prison sentence of two or more years.

Applicants for a record suspension must be able to show that they have completed their sentences in full and provide proof of payment.

Individuals can apply for a pardon by filling out the application forms available from the Parole Board and by paying a $50 pardon/record suspension application fee.

==== Clemency ====
In Canada, clemency is granted by the governor general of Canada or the Governor in Council (the federal cabinet) under the royal prerogative of mercy. Applications are also made to the National Parole Board, as in pardons, but clemency may involve the commutation of a sentence, or the remission of all or part of the sentence, a respite from the sentence (for a medical condition or a relief from a prohibition, e.g., to allow someone to drive who has been prohibited from driving).

=== Chile ===
In Chile, the institution of pardon (indulto) is regulated in the Criminal Code (article 93, Nº 4º), which deals with the extinction of criminal liability. A pardon "only grants the remission or the commutation of the sentence; it does not remove the condition of having been condemned". The pardon may be either general, when it is granted to all those covered by a specific law passed by qualified quorum in National Congress, or particular, when it is granted by Supreme Decree of the president of the republic. In Chile's presidential regime, the president is the head of state; in this capacity, the president has the discretionary power to grant particular pardons and is not obliged to seek opinion or approval from other authorities, although, the granting of pardons is limited by the norms of Law No. 18.050 (1981), and its Regulations (Decree No. 1542 of 1981 on particular pardons), which forbid particular pardons for those convicted of a crime of terrorism.

=== China ===
The 1954 Constitution of China made provision for amnesties and pardons, both of which were to be powers of the Standing Committee of the National People's Congress. The amnesty or pardon would then be issued by the president. Chairman Mao Zedong and President Liu Shaoqi released the first-time pardon in 1959.

The later three constitutions promulgated in 1975, 1978, and 1982 all removed provision amnesty and only kept pardons. In China, pardons are decided by the National Standing Committee of the People's Congress and issued by the president.

=== Egypt ===
On 23 September 2015, President Abdel Fattah el-Sisi issued a pardon freeing 100 activists, including Al Jazeera journalists Mohamed Fahmy and Baher Mohamed.

=== France ===
Pardons and acts of clemency (droit de grâce) are granted by the president of France, who, ultimately, is the sole judge of the propriety of the measure. It is a prerogative of the president which is directly inherited from that of the kings of France. The convicted person sends a request for pardon to the president of the republic. The prosecutor of the court that pronounced the verdict reports on the case, and the case goes to the Ministry of Justice's directorate of criminal affairs and pardons for further consideration.

If granted, the decree of pardon is signed by the president, the prime minister, the minister of justice, and possibly other ministers involved in the consideration of the case. It is not published in the Journal Officiel.

The decree may spare the applicant from serving the balance of their sentence, or commute the sentence to a lesser one. It does not suppress the right for the victim of the crime to obtain compensation for the damages it suffered, and does not erase the condemnation from the criminal record.

When the death penalty was in force in France, all capital sentences resulted in a presidential review for possible clemency. Executions were carried out if and only if the president rejected clemency, by signing a document on which it was written: "decides to let justice take its course".

The Parliament of France, on occasions, grants amnesty. This is a different concept and procedure from that described above, although the phrase "presidential amnesty" (amnistie présidentielle) is sometimes pejoratively applied to some acts of parliament traditionally voted upon after a presidential election, granting amnesty for minor crimes.

=== Germany ===
The right to grant pardon in Germany is divided between the federal and the state level. Federal jurisdiction in matters of criminal law is mostly restricted to appeals against decisions of state courts. Only "political" crimes like treason or terrorism are tried on behalf of the federal government by the highest state courts. Accordingly, the category of persons eligible for a federal pardon is rather narrow. The right to grant a federal pardon lies in the office of the president of Germany, but the president can transfer this power to other persons, such as the chancellor or the minister of justice.

In early 2007, there was a widespread public discussion about the granting of pardons in Germany after convicted Red Army Faction terrorist Christian Klar, who was serving six consecutive sentences of life imprisonment, filed a petition for pardon. President Horst Köhler ultimately denied his request. Following a court decision, Klar was released on parole in December 2008.

For all other (and therefore the vast majority of) convicts, pardons are in the jurisdiction of the states. In some states it is granted by the respective cabinet, but in most states the state constitution vests the authority in the state prime minister. As on the federal level, the authority may be transferred. Amnesty can be granted only by federal law.

=== Greece ===
The Constitution of Greece grants the power of pardon to the president of the republic (Art. 47, § 1). The president can pardon, commute or remit punishment imposed by any court, on the proposal of the minister of justice and after receiving the opinion (not the consent necessarily) of the Pardon Committee.

=== Hong Kong ===
Prior to the handover of Hong Kong in 1997, the power of pardon was the royal prerogative of mercy of the monarch of the United Kingdom. This was used and cited the most often in cases of convicts who had been given the death penalty: from 1965 to 1993 (when the death penalty was formally abolished) death sentences were automatically commuted to life imprisonment under the royal prerogative.

Since the transfer, the chief executive of Hong Kong now exercises the power to grant pardons and commute penalties under section 12 of article 48 Basic Law of Hong Kong. "The Chief Executive of the Hong Kong Special Administrative Region shall exercise the following powers and functions ... to pardon persons convicted of criminal offences or commute their penalties".

=== India ===
Under the Constitution of India (Article 72), the president of India can grant a pardon or reduce the sentence of a convicted person, particularly in cases involving capital punishment. A similar and parallel power vests in the governors of each state under Article 161.

The Constitution of India vests sovereign power in the president and governors. The governance in the centre and states is carried out in the name of the president and governor respectively. The president is empowered with the power to pardon under Article 72 of the Indian Constitution, which says that the president shall have the power to grant pardons, reprieves, respites or remissions of punishment or to suspend, remit or commute the sentence of any person convicted of any offence. The meaning of these terms is as follows:

The pardoning powers of the Indian president are elucidated in Art 72 of the Indian Constitution. There are five different types of pardoning which are mandated by law.

1. Pardon: completely absolving the person of the crime and letting him go free. The pardoned criminal will be treated like a normal citizen.
2. Commutation: changing the type of punishment given to the guilty into a less harsh one, for example, a death penalty commuted to a life sentence.
3. Reprieve: a delay allowed in the execution of a sentence, usually a death sentence, for a guilty person to allow him some time to apply for a presidential pardon or any other legal remedy to prove his innocence or allow for successful rehabilitation.
4. Respite: reducing the quantum or degree of the punishment to a criminal in view of some special circumstances, like pregnancy, mental condition to name a few.
5. Remission: changing the quantum of the punishment without changing its nature, for example reducing twenty years worth of rigorous imprisonment to ten years.

Article 72 reads:

- (1) The President shall have the power to grant pardons, reprieves, respites or remission of punishment or to suspend remit or commute the sentence of any persons convicted of any offence—
  - (a) in all cases where the punishment or sentence is by a court martial;
  - (b) in all cases where the punishment or sentence is for an offence against any law relating to a matter to which the executive power of the Union extends;
  - (c) in all cases where the sentence is a sentence of death.
- (2) Nothing in sub- clause (a) of clause (1) shall alter the power conferred by law on any officer of the Armed Forces of the Union to suspend, remit or commute a sentence passed by a Court Martial.
- (3) Nothing in sub-clause (c) of clause (1) shall affect the power to suspend remit or commute a sentence of death exercisable by the Governor of a State under any law for the time being in force.

Similarly, as per article 161, the governor of a state has the power to grant pardons, reprieves, respites or remissions of punishment or to suspend, remit or commute the sentence of any person convicted of any offence against any law relating to a matter to which the executive power of the state extends. The president can grant a pardon to a person awarded death sentence; however, the governor of a state does not enjoy this power.

The question is whether this power to grant a pardon is absolute or this power of pardon shall be exercised by the president on the advice of the Council of Ministers. The pardoning power of the president is not absolute. It is governed by the advice of the Council of Ministers. This has not been discussed by the constitution but is the practical truth. Further, the constitution does not provide for any mechanism to question the legality of decisions of the president or governors exercising mercy jurisdiction. Nonetheless, the SC in the Epuru Sudhakar case has given a small window for judicial review of the pardon powers of the president and governors for the purpose of ruling out any arbitrariness. The court has earlier held that court has retained the power of judicial review even on a matter which has been vested by the Constitution solely in the executive.

However, India has a unitary legal system and there is no separate body of state law. All crimes are crimes against the Union of India. Therefore, a convention has developed that the governor's powers are exercised for only minor offenses, while requests for pardons and reprieves for major offenses and offenses committed in the union territories are deferred to the president.

Both the president and governor are bound by the advice of their respective Councils of Ministers and hence the exercise of this power is of an executive character. It is therefore subject to judicial review as held by the Supreme Court of India in the case of Maru Ram v. Union of India [1980] INSC 213, 1981 (1) SCC 107, Supreme Court. It was subsequently confirmed by Kehar Singh v. Union of India [1988] INSC 370, 1989(1) SCC 204, Supreme Court. In the case of Epuru Sudhakar & Anr vs Govt. Of A.P. & Ors [2006] INSC 638, Supreme Court, it was held that "clemency is subject to judicial review and that it cannot be dispensed as a privilege or act of grace". The court made these observation while quashing the decision of then Governor of Andhra Pradesh Sushil Kumar Shinde in commuting the sentence of a convicted Congress activist.

=== Iran ===
In the Islamic Republic of Iran, the Supreme Leader has the power to pardon and offer clemency under Article 110, § 1, §§ 11.

=== Ireland ===
==== Constitutional basis ====
The Irish constitution states (in Article 13.6) that

The right of pardon and the power to commute or remit punishment imposed by any court exercising criminal jurisdiction are hereby vested in the President, but such power of commutation or remission may also be conferred by law on other authorities.

The power of clemency is nominally exercised by the president. However, the president of Ireland must act "on the advice" of the Government (cabinet), so in practice the clemency decisions are made by the government of the day and the president has no discretion in the matter. The responsibility can also be delegated to people or bodies other than the president.

Amnesty and immunity, on the other hand, are usually dealt with by an Act of the Oireachtas rather than by a general form of pardon or a slate of individual pardons.

There are two methods by which a pardon may proceed:

==== Method I ====
In the first procedure, aimed at miscarriages of justice, the minister for justice may recommend to the Government that they formally advise the president to grant a pardon, and any conditions along with it. The 1993 Criminal Procedure Act provides the method by which a person convicted of an offence may apply for a pardon. Under this procedure, the person must:

- Have already been convicted.
- Have used up their appeals.
- Allege a new fact (previously known and believed to be significant, but which he has a reasonable excuse for not having mentioned) or newly discovered fact (including a fact previously known which was not believed to be significant) showing a miscarriage of justice has taken place.

Then they can apply in writing to the minister for justice for a pardon. The minister may then "make or cause to be made such inquiries as they consider necessary" and may refuse to grant the pardon on his/her own initiative, or if they think the person should be pardoned, bring such argument to cabinet.

==== Method II ====
Section six of the act allows a minister for justice to seek or receive a pardon request from someone whose case is not a 'miscarriage of justice', but has some other fault, such as an archaic law, a law being misapplied by a rogue judge, a reduction in the harshness of a sentence or a substitution of a sentence, without having to go through the procedure above, gone through appeals, or presented new facts. It also allows the minister to waive the procedure in a case of miscarriage of justice if the specific case warrants it. It may also allow prospective pardons as it allows the minister to pardon someone who has not been convicted yet, which the other procedure requires.

==== Committee of Inquiry ====
The government itself may assemble a committee to study the case in more detail on their behalf. This may consist of anyone, and any number, but the chair must be:

- A judge or former judge or
- A barrister of at least 10 years standing or
- A solicitor of at least 10 years standing.

This special committee may look to any material it sees fit to make its decision, even if it was not, or would not be, available to a jury or trial judge in a normal court. The government do not have to be bound by the committee recommendations.

==== Pardons under military law ====
Under Section 7(5) of the act, the same powers of the minister for justice apply to the minister for defence in the case of military officers and enlisted convicted by courts martial.

==== Compensation ====
The minister for justice or defence may also, in their absolute discretion, pay compensation, determined by them alone, to any person given a pardon, if this compensation is applied for. If they think the compensation is too low they may challenge for a higher figure in the High Court.

==== List of people who have received a presidential pardon since 1938 ====
The power is used very infrequently compared to, for example, pardons in the United States.

- 1940 – Thomas Quinn, granted by Douglas Hyde
- 1943 – Walter Brady, granted by Douglas Hyde
- 1992 – Nicky Kelly, granted by Mary Robinson
- 1999 – William Geary, granted by Mary McAleese
- 2018 – Maolra Seoighe, granted by Michael D. Higgins
- 2021 – John Twiss, granted by Michael D. Higgins

=== Israel ===
In Israel the president has the power to pardon criminals or commute their sentences. The president's pardon powers are set out in the Basic Laws of Israel. The pardon is given following a recommendation by the minister of justice.

After the Kav 300 affair, President Chaim Herzog issued a pardon to four members of the Shin Bet prior to them being indicted. This unusual act was the first of its kind in Israel.

=== Italy ===
In Italy, the president of the republic may "grant pardons, or commute punishments" according to article 87 of the Italian Constitution. Like other acts of the president, the pardon requires the countersignature of the competent government minister. The Constitutional Court of Italy has ruled that the minister of justice is obliged to sign acts of pardon.

The pardon may remove the punishment altogether or change its form. Unless the decree of pardon states otherwise, the pardon does not remove any incidental effects of a criminal conviction, such as a mention in a certificate of conduct (174 c.p.) or the loss of civil rights.

According to article 79 of the Italian Constitution the Parliament may grant amnesty (article 151 c.p.) and pardon (article 174 c.p.) by law deliberated a majority of two-thirds of the components. The last general pardon, discounting three years from sentences, was approved in 2006.

=== Morocco ===
In Morocco, the king has the right to grant pardons pursuant to Article 58 of the Constitution of Morocco and Dahir (royal decree) No. 1-57-387 of 6 February 1958. Requests for pardon are required to go through an examination process by a commission comprising the minister of justice and representatives of the supreme court prior to approval by the king.

The right to pardon was traditionally recognized as a common practice among the sultans of the Alawi dynasty, and were only codified into the constitution by Hassan II (r. 1961–1999). This prerogative is currently used several times per year by the monarch during public holidays.

On one occasion, a pardon which was granted by Mohammed VI to Daniel Galván, a Spanish convicted child rapist, was revoked following public outrage.

=== Poland ===
In Poland, the president is granted the right of pardon by Article 139 of the Constitution of the Republic of Poland. Whether the president may grant relief prior to (final) conviction remains controversial, as the Supreme Court and the Constitutional Tribunal have opposing views.

By president:

- Wojciech Jaruzelski
  - Approved — 607
  - Declined — 119
- Lech Wałęsa
  - Approved — 3,454
  - Declined — 444
- Aleksander Kwaśniewski
  - Approved (both terms) — 4,302
  - Declined (both terms) — 2,639
- Lech Kaczyński
  - Approved — 201
  - Declined — 913
- Bronisław Komorowski
  - Approved — 360
  - Declined — 1,544
- Andrzej Duda (prior to 16 April 2025)
  - Approved (both terms) — 143
  - Declined (both terms) — 936

=== Portugal ===
In Portugal, the heads of state – kings or presidents – have always enjoyed the prerogative of grace, being able to grant pardons, commuting or extinguishing sentences in the context of requests for clemency.

According to the Portuguese Constitution, the president of the Portuguese Republic has the power to pardon and commute sentences, on the proposal of the Government of the Portuguese Republic. This is the exclusive and discretionary competence of the president and is not subject to any conditions beyond the prior hearing of the Government, generally represented by the minister of justice. Requests or proposals for pardons are instructed by the Criminal Execution Court by referral from the Ministry of Justice and subsequently submitted to the president for consideration. The pardon is granted by presidential decree; if the pardon is denied, the president decides by order. Traditionally pardons are granted during the Christmas period. The pardon can be revoked by the president of the republic.

In 2019, president Marcelo Rebelo de Sousa granted two pardons.

The pardon, as an individual, shall not be confused with amnesty or generic forgiveness, both of a general and abstract nature. Amnesty has retroactive effects, affecting not only the penalty applied but the past criminal act itself, which is forgotten, considered as not practiced (retroactive abolition of crime). Generic forgiveness focuses only on the penalties determined by the sentencing decision and for the future. It is the reserved competence of the Portuguese Parliament to approve generic amnesties and pardons.

=== Russia ===
The president of the Russian Federation is granted the right of pardon by Article 89 of the Constitution of the Russian Federation. The chain of pardon committees manage lists of people eligible for pardon and directs them to the president for signing. While President Boris Yeltsin frequently used his power of pardon (1998 – 7,000 to 8,000 cases), his successor Vladimir Putin is much more hesitant; he granted five pardons in 2014 and two in 2015. In 2021, Vladimir Putin officially pardoned six convicted offenders.

A pardon can be requested at any time, although a one-year waiting period is required between requests. This right is granted to citizens of the Russian Federation by Article 50 of the constitution.

The Regulation on the Procedure for Considering Requests for Pardon in the Russian Federation, which was approved by Executive Order No.787, states that a pardon may be granted to the following individuals:

1. Individuals convicted by Russian courts and serving their sentences on Russian territory.
2. Individuals convicted by foreign courts and serving their sentences in Russian territory (in accordance with international treaties).
3. Individuals released on parole.
4. Probationers and individuals serving suspended sentences by Russian courts.
5. Individuals who have served their sentences but maintain official convictions on record.

As of 2023, Russia had pardoned over 5,000 convicts after they completed contracts with Wagner Group, a mercenary group, to fight in Russia's invasion of Ukraine. Yevgeny Prigozhin, the group's founder, offered thousands of inmates clemency in exchange for fighting in the most dangerous theaters of the war. The program is no longer in effect as of 2024.

=== Rwanda ===
The prerogative of mercy is a form of pardon that can be exercised by the president of Rwanda. The prerogative is one of the powers of the president defined by the Constitution of Rwanda, which came into effect in 2003 following a national referendum. According to the Constitution of Rwanda, "The President of the Republic has authority to exercise the prerogative of mercy in accordance with the procedure determined by law and after consulting the Supreme Court on the matter."

=== South Africa ===
Under section 84(2)(j) of the Constitution of South Africa, 1996 (Act 108 of 1996), the president of South Africa is responsible for pardoning or reprieving offenders. This power of the president is only exercised in highly exceptional cases.

To pardon a person is to forgive a person for his/her deeds. The pardon process is therefore not available to persons who maintain their innocence and is not an advanced form of appeal procedure.

Pardon is only granted for minor offences after a period of ten years has elapsed since the relevant conviction.

For many serious offences (for example if the relevant court viewed the offence in such a serious light that direct imprisonment was imposed) pardon will not be granted even if more than ten years have elapsed since the conviction.

=== Spain ===
The derecho de gracia ("right of grace") or indulto ("pardon") is acknowledged by the Spanish Constitution of 1978 as a privilege of the king of Spain (article 62.i: "Functions of the King"). Spanish law defines it as a renunciation on the state's part of its own punitive power on behalf of an individual, founded on reasons of equity or public interest. The Constitution subjects royal pardons to the law and forbids general pardons, so they have to be granted individually. Theoretically, a royal pardon can be granted for a general offense or accessory offenses alone; if it is granted for a general offense, the accessory ones it implies are also pardoned, with the exception of punishments involving political rights (i.e., removal of the right to run for a public office as a result of a sentence), which have to be explicitly mentioned in the pardon decree if they are going to be pardoned.

The procedure and requirements for the grant of the pardon are given by the Law of 18 June 1870, modified by Law 1/1988 of 14 January. The application for royal pardon has to be carried out by the convicted person himself, his relatives or any other person in his name. The convicting court will then issue a report of the case, which shall be considered along with the public comments of the prosecutor and the victims of the crime if there were any. All of this is gathered by the minister of justice, who will present the pardon issue to the Cabinet of Ministers. If the Cabinet decides a pardon should be granted, then the minister of justice will recommend as such to the king. Pardons are issued by royal decree and have to be published in the Boletín Oficial del Estado ("Public Journal").

Pardons are not commonly conceded in Spain but for offenders convicted for minor crimes who are about to complete their sentence and have shown good behaviour and repentance. Dating back to medieval times, several organisations and religious brotherhoods still hold the right of granting pardons as part of some privilege or other granted to them by the king of Spain. The scope of this privilege depends on the royal charter received by the organisation when their right to concede pardons was granted, though it usually holds only for minor offenses in very especial conditions; this right is implicitly acknowledged by the public offices nowadays, though it is not exercised but following the usual procedure for royal pardons. Traditionally, they will propose some petty criminal about to end his sentence for pardon being granted to him, and he/she will be released following the tradition to which the pardon holds, usually during the Holy Week. This type of pardons are distinguished from the usual ones in that they only release the prisoner from jail, halting the sentence, but do not pardon the offense itself.

=== Sri Lanka ===
In Sri Lanka, under the Sri Lankan Constitution the president can grant a pardon, respite or substitute a less severe form of punishment for any punishment imposed to any offender convicted of any offence in any court within the Republic of Sri Lanka. It is generally referred to as a presidential pardon.

=== Switzerland ===
In Switzerland, pardons may be granted by the Swiss Federal Assembly for crimes prosecuted by the federal authorities. For crimes under cantonal jurisdiction, cantonal law designates the authority competent to grant pardons (if any). In most cantons, the cantonal parliament may pardon felonies, and the cantonal government may pardon misdemeanors and minor infractions.

=== Turkey ===
The president of Turkey is granted the right of pardon under certain circumstances defined in the constitution, article 104. According to the article, the president can "remit, on grounds of chronic illness, disability, or old age, all or part of the sentences imposed on certain individuals". After the convict's or their proxy's application, if the Council of Forensic Medicine determines that the convict suffers from chronic illness, disability, or old age, the Ministry of Justice presents the situation to the president, and the president can choose to grant a pardon.

Additionally, the parliament of Turkey has the power to announce general amnesty.

=== United Kingdom ===
The power to grant pardons and reprieves in the United Kingdom is known as the royal prerogative of mercy. It was traditionally in the absolute power of the monarch to pardon an individual for a crime, whether or not he or she had been convicted, and thereby commute any penalty; the power was then delegated both to the judiciary and the sovereign's ministers. Since the creation of legal rights of appeal, the royal prerogative of mercy is no longer exercised by the person of the sovereign, or by the judiciary, but only by the government.

In constitutional terms, under the doctrine of the rule of law, the power of ministers to overrule the judiciary by commuting criminal sanctions imposed resolves different and sometimes conflicting public interests. In civil matters, only the legislative branch, and not ministers, have the power to override the judiciary.

The Indemnity and Oblivion Act 1660 was a general pardon for everyone who had committed crimes during the English Civil War and Interregnum with some exceptions for regicides and serious crimes.

Until the nineteenth century, for many crimes the sentence was mandatory and was formally pronounced in court immediately upon conviction, but judges and ministers were given powers to exercise the royal prerogative of mercy out of court, in order to mitigate the rigour of the law. Before there was any general form of criminal appeal, a judge might grant a pardon either by way of clemency, because he felt in his opinion that the law was unduly harsh (for example, in the case of convictions of minors), that the verdict was dubious, to seek public approval, or it was otherwise in the public interest. Capital sentences imposed by the assizes were generally executed when the assize was concluded and as the circuit judge left the town, so there was a limited window of time to apply to a judge or directly to the Crown for a pardon. Especially for assizes that were far away from the then capital and major cities of London, York, Durham, Edinburgh, or Dublin, a pardon might well arrive too late. Perhaps as a form of temporary punishment, to give solace, to avoid public disorder, to consult or obtain further evidence, or to maximise the public approval of the King's mercy, judges often did not grant their pardons until their departures; the convict often hoped until his last moments that the sentence of death would not actually be executed, and it was generally popular for a reprieve to arrive at the scaffold at the very moment of the execution.

Conditional pardons were granted to many in the 18th century, in return for transportation to British colonies overseas for life in lieu, especially to the Australian colonies.

The first known general pardon in post-Conquest England was issued during the celebrations at the coronation of King Edward III in 1327. In 2006, all British Armed Forces soldiers who were executed for cowardice during the First World War were given a statutory pardon by an Act of Parliament (the Armed Forces Act 2006), following a long-running controversy about the justice of their executions.

Today the sovereign only grants pardons upon the advice of their ministers: currently they are the Lord Chancellor, for England and Wales; the First Minister of Scotland; or the Secretary of State for Northern Ireland. The Secretary of State for Defence is responsible for military cases. It is the standard policy of the government to only grant pardons to those who are considered "morally" innocent of the offence, as opposed to those who may have been wrongly convicted by a misapplication of the law. Pardons are generally no longer issued prior to a conviction, but only after the conviction. The royal prerogative of mercy is now rarely used, given that the Criminal Cases Review Commission and the Scottish Criminal Cases Review Commission are now avenues to statutory remedies against miscarriages of justice.

Therefore, the grant of pardons is now very rare occurrence indeed, and the vast majority of acknowledged miscarriages of justice were decided upon by the courts. During the Birmingham Six case, Home Secretary Douglas Hurd stressed that he could only make the decision for a pardon if he was "convinced of [their] innocence", which at the time he was not.

One recent case was that of two drug smugglers, John Haase and Paul Bennett. They were pardoned in July 1996 from their sentences of imprisonment both of 18 years, having served some ten months, on the advice of Home Secretary Michael Howard. This was intended as a reward for their information given to the authorities, but there were speculations as to the motives of the Home Secretary. In 2008 they were sentenced to imprisonment for 20 and 22 years, respectively, after subsequent discovery that the information they gave was unreliable.

In 1980, after the courts had dismissed their appeals, the Home Secretary, William Whitelaw, used the royal prerogative of mercy to free David Cooper and Michael McMahon from their imprisonment, both having been convicted of murder on poor evidence.

Under the Act of Settlement 1701, a pardon cannot prevent a person from being impeached by Parliament, but a pardon may commute any penalties imposed for the conviction. In England and Wales no person may be pardoned for an offence under Section 11 of the Habeas Corpus Act 1679 (unlawfully transporting prisoners out of England and Wales).

=== United States ===
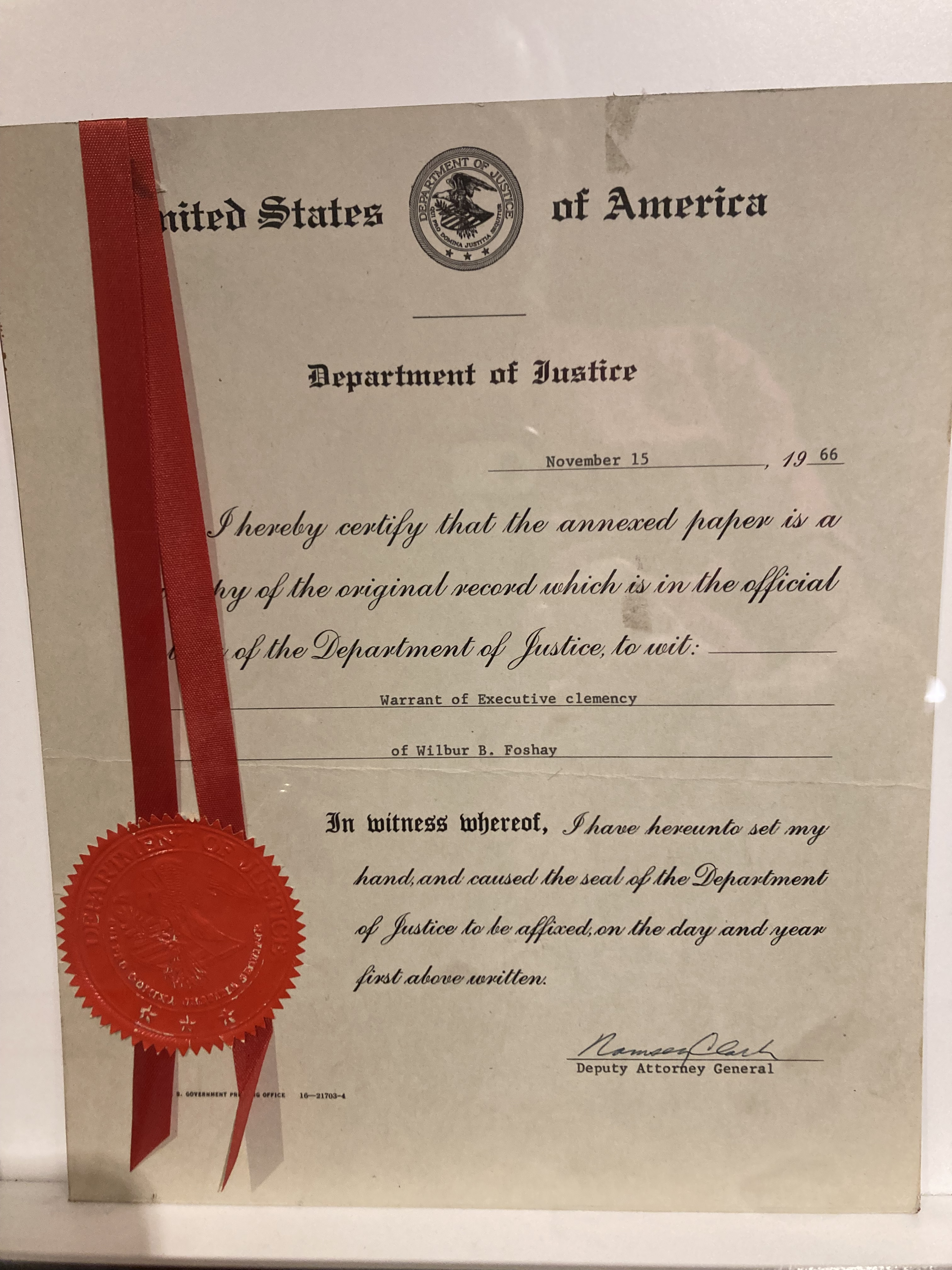
A 1966 U.S. Clemency Certificate

==== Federal government ====
In the United States, the pardon power for offenses against the United States is granted to the president of the United States under Article II, Section 2 of the United States Constitution which states that the president "shall have power to grant reprieves and pardons for offenses against the United States, except in cases of impeachment". The U.S. Supreme Court has interpreted this language to include the power to grant many different forms of clemency (generally less sweeping than a full pardon), including not only pardons, but also conditional pardons, commutations of sentence, conditional commutations of sentence, remissions of fines, forfeitures and other criminal financial penalties, respites and reprieves, and amnesties.

The pardon power of the president applies only to convictions under federal law. Additionally, the power extends to military court-martial cases as well as convictions in the Superior Court of the District of Columbia.

Almost all pardon petitions are addressed to the president, who grants or denies the request. In some cases, the president will, of their own accord, issue a pardon. Since the 19th century, applications for pardons have been referred for review and non-binding recommendation by the Office of the Pardon Attorney, an official of the United States Department of Justice.

==== State law ====
The governors of most U.S. states have the power to grant pardons, reprieves and other forms of clemency for offenses under state criminal law. In other states, that power is committed to an appointed agency or board, or to a board and the governor in some hybrid arrangement (in some states the agency is merged with that of the parole board, as in the Oklahoma Pardon and Parole Board).

Nine states in the United States have boards of pardons and paroles that exclusively grant all state pardons. These states are: Alabama (Board of Pardons and Paroles), Connecticut (Board of Pardons and Paroles), Georgia (Board of Pardons and Paroles), Idaho (Commission of Pardons and Paroles), Minnesota (Board of Pardons), Nebraska (Board of Pardons), Nevada (Board of Pardon Commissioners), South Carolina (Board of Probation, Parole and Pardon), and Utah (Utah Board of Pardons and Parole).

On at least four occasions, state governors – Toney Anaya of New Mexico in 1986, George Ryan of Illinois in 2003, Martin O'Malley of Maryland in 2014, and Kate Brown of Oregon in 2022 – have commuted all death sentences in their respective states prior to leaving office.

== Related concepts ==
These terms differ subtly from country to country, but generally:

- Clemency is a general concept of amelioration of penalties, especially by action of executive officials; the forms it may take include the following:
  - Amnesty: A pardon applied to a group of people rather than an individual. President Jimmy Carter offered amnesty to anyone who had evaded the draft. Weapon amnesties are often granted so that people can hand in weapons to the police without any legal questions being asked as to where they obtained them, why they had them, etc. After a civil war a mass amnesty may be granted to absolve all participants of guilt and "move on". Amnesties are typically applied in advance of any prosecution for the crime.
  - Commutation: Substituting the imposed penalty for a crime with a lesser penalty, whilst still remaining guilty of the original crime (e.g., someone who is guilty of murder may have their sentence commuted to life imprisonment rather than death, or the term of imprisonment may be reduced).
  - Remission: Complete or partial cancellation of the penalty, whilst still being considered guilty of said crime (i.e., reduced penalty). (This should not be confused with what is known in the United States as remission of remand, in which a case is sent back to a lower court from which it was appealed, with instructions as to what further proceedings should be held.)
  - Reprieve: Temporary postponement of a punishment, usually so that the accused can mount an appeal (especially if he or she has been sentenced to death).
  - Respite: The delay of an ordered sentence, or the act of temporarily imposing a lesser sentence upon the convicted, whilst further investigation, action, or appeals can be conducted.
- Parole is the provisional early release of a prisoner who agrees to abide by imposed behavioral conditions, generally including periodic check-ins with parole officers. Failure to comply with the terms of early release may result in reincarcertion.
- Expungement: The process by which the record of a criminal conviction is destroyed or sealed from the official repository, thus removing any traces of guilt or conviction.
- Immunity from prosecution: A prosecutor may grant immunity, usually to a witness, in exchange for testimony or production of other evidence. The prosecutor (conditionally) agrees not to prosecute a crime that the witness might have committed in exchange for said evidence. For example, a car thief who witnesses a murder might be granted immunity for his crime as an inducement to identify, and perhaps to truthfully testify against the murderer. Some criminals who testify for the prosecution may be offered immunity from prosecution for their own crimes.

== See also ==
- Acts of grace (piracy) – Pardons for acts of piracy
- Blackstone's ratio – 1760s legal maxim by William Blackstone
- Deferred prosecution – Way to avoid prosecution
- Error of impunity – Insufficient punishment of criminals
- Ius strictum
- Might makes right – View that morality is, or ought to be, determined by those in power
