= C36 =

C36 or C-36 may refer to:

== Vehicles ==
Aircraft

- Caspar C 36, a German reconnaissance aircraft
- Castel C-36, a French glider
- EKW C-36, a Swiss multi-purpose combat aircraft
- Lockheed C-36 Electra, an American military transport aircraft

Automobiles

- Covini C36 Turbotronic, an Italian concept car
- DFSK C36, a Chinese van
- Mercedes-Benz C36 AMG, a German automobile
- Sauber C36, a Swiss Formula One car

Locomotives

- New South Wales C36 class locomotive, an Australian steam locomotive

Ships

- HMS C36, a C-class submarine of the Royal Navy

== Other uses ==
- C-36 (cipher machine)
- C36 road (Namibia)
- 15 cm TbtsK C/36 naval gun, a German medium-caliber naval gun
- Bill C-36, various legislation of the Parliament of Canada
- Caldwell 36, a spiral galaxy
- King's Gambit, a chess opening
