= Respite =

Respite may be:

- Respite (law), a delay in the imposition of sentence
- Respite care, planned or emergency temporary care provided to caregivers of a child or adult
- "Respite", a track from Undertale Soundtrack, 2015
