= CBGA =

CBGA may refer to:

- ceramic ball grid array
- Canadian Beef Grading Agency
- CBGA-FM, a radio station (102.1 FM) licensed to Matane, Quebec, Canada
- central bank gold agreement
- cannabigerolic acid
