= Federal Public Sector Labour Relations and Employment Board =

Independent quasi-judicial tribunal in Canada

- Commission des relations de travail et de l’emploi dans le secteur public fédéral

Board overview
- Formed: November 1, 2014
- Preceding agencies: Public Service Labour Relations Board; Public Service Staffing Tribunal
- Type: quasi-judicial statutory tribunal
- Headquarters: C.D. Howe Building, 240 Sparks St., Ottawa, ON
- Minister responsible: Joël Lightbound, Minister of Public Services and Procurement
- Board executive: Edith Bramwell, Chairperson
- Key document: Federal Public Sector Labour Relations and Employment Board Act
- Website: https://fpslreb-crtespf.gc.ca/

The Federal Public Sector Labour Relations and Employment Board (FPSLREB; French: Commission des relations de travail et de l’emploi dans le secteur public fédéral, LCRTESPF) is an independent quasi-judicial tribunal that administers the collective bargaining and "grievance adjudication systems" in Canada's federal public service and in Parliament.

It formed on 1 November 2014 through the merger of the former Public Service Labour Relations Board and the former Public Service Staffing Tribunal. It resolves labour relations issues and staffing complaints among federal public servants through adjudication and mediation.

== History ==
The Public Service Labour Relations Board (French: Commission des relations de travail dans la fonction publique) was an independent quasi-judicial statutory tribunal that reported to Parliament through the Minister of Public Services and Procurement. It was responsible for administering the collective bargaining and grievance adjudication systems in the federal public service and in Parliament. Moreover, by agreement with the Government of the Yukon, the Board also administered the collective bargaining and grievance adjudication systems under the Yukon Education Staff Relations Act and the Yukon Public Service Staff Relations Act.

In 2003, a new Public Service Labour Relations Act was passed by Parliament (S.C. 2003, c.22), coming into force on 1 April 2005, replacing the Public Service Staff Relations Act (R.S.C., 1985, c. P-35). In 2014, the Board was merged with the Public Service Staffing Tribunal under the Federal Public Sector Labour Relations and Employment Board Act to form the Federal Public Sector Labour Relations and Employment Board. As such, today's Board is responsible for the duties that were previously dealt with by the former tribunals under the Federal Public Sector Labour Relations Act and the Public Service Employment Act, respectively.

== Organization ==
=== Members ===
The Board is composed of a chairperson, up to 2 vice-chairpersons, up to 12 full-time members, and additional part-time members as required. The Governor in Council appoints full-time Board members for terms of no longer than 5 years and part-time Board members for terms of up to 3 years, and may be re-appointed any number of times.

As of 25 April 2021, full-time members include:

- Edith Bramwell, Chairperson
- Amélie Lavictoire, Vice-chairperson
- Audrey Lizotte, Vice-chairperson
- Adrien Bieniasiewicz
- Pierre-Marc Champagne
- Caroline Engmann
- Goretti Fukamusenge
- Bryan R. Gray
- Patricia Harewood
- Asha M. Kurian
- Nicholas Pernal
- Christopher Rootham
- Nancy Rosenberg
- Brian Russell

and 11 part-time board members

=== Legislation and clients ===
Under the Federal Public Sector Labour Relations and Employment Board Act, the Board is responsible for interpreting and applying the following legislation:

- Federal Public Sector Labour Relations Act (FPSLRA) — Collective bargaining and grievance adjudication systems for the federal public sector and Parliament, as well as RCMP members and reservists.
- Public Service Employment Act (PSEA) — Complaints related to internal appointments, appointment revocations, and lay-offs in the federal public service.
- Canadian Human Rights Act — Human rights issues in grievances and complaints under FPSLRA and PSEA.
- Parliamentary Employment and Staff Relations Act — Collective bargaining and grievance adjudication for the institutions of Parliament.
- Public Sector Equitable Compensation Act — Pay equity complaints in the federal public service. This Act is to be repealed and replaced by the Pay Equity Act, which received royal assent on 13 December 2018 but is not yet in force.
- Canada Labour Code, Part II — Complaints related to workplace health and safety and reprisals in the federal public service.

The Treasury Board of Canada, employing over 279,000 public servants in 27 bargaining units, is the main employer covered by the Board's mandate. The majority (60%) of unionized federal public service employees are represented by the Public Service Alliance of Canada, while 23% are represented by the Professional Institute of the Public Service of Canada as the second-largest bargaining agent, and 17% are represented by the other 25 bargaining units.

== See also ==
- Civil Service Act 1918
