= Parole Board of Canada =

Federal government agency

- Badge of the PBC

- Coat of arms of the PBC

Agency overview
- Formed: 1959
- Jurisdiction: Government of Canada
- Headquarters: Ottawa, Ontario; 45°25′30″N 75°41′59″W
- Employees: Fulltime equivalents 528 (2025–26)
- Annual budget: Planned spending CAD$72.3 million (2025)
- Minister responsible: Gary Anandasangaree, Minister of Public Safety
- Parole board responsible: Joanne Blanchard; Shannon Stewart (acting); Liane Sauer
- Parent department: Public Safety Canada
- Website: Official website

The Parole Board of Canada (PBC; French: Commission des libérations conditionnelles du Canada; formerly known as the National Parole Board) is the Canadian government agency that is responsible for reviewing and issuing parole and criminal pardons in Canada. It operates under the auspices of Public Safety Canada.

== History ==
The old Ticket of Leave Act was replaced by the Parole Act of 1959, which enshrined the principle of rehabilitation. As conceived by the Parole Act, the Parole Board of Canada was a completely independent parole decision-making authority. The legislators envisioned a very powerful organization, with considerable discretionary authority and a much broader mandate than the old Remission Service had. To ensure their immunity from political interference or influence, the five Board members were appointed for 10-year terms, with the possibility of renewal. The legislation set out the new criteria for parole: the Board could release an inmate who "derived the maximum benefit from imprisonment," when "the reform and rehabilitation of the inmate will be aided by parole," and when "release would not be an undue risk to society." Discretion, of course, is a double-edged sword. The Board had the freedom to deal with each case on its own merits. It also, unfortunately, had the freedom to make mistakes. Board member Frank Miller, for one, saw the potential for disaster: "I tried and tried to get them to have a policy," but the members were confident they could rely on their own judgement. The Corrections and Conditional Release Act, Criminal Records Act and the Criminal Code specify the authorities for the PBC.

Léopold Dion was paroled in 1963. He had been sentenced to life in prison for rape and attempted murder and previously violating parole by sexually assaulting a young boy. Within 18 months of being released, Dion molested 21 children and murdered four of them. Dion was subsequently killed in prison.

A report by the Canadian Police Association revealed that between 1998 and 2003, 66 people have been killed by convicts out on early release. It found that the whereabouts of over 800 federal offenders and over 1100 provincial offenders on parole and escapees in Canada were unknown.

Eric Norman Fish was released to a halfway house in 2004 in Vernon, British Columbia. Fish had been serving a life sentence for a 1984 murder. In 2004, Fish was charged with the murder of Jeffrey Drake, whose body was found on the shore of Okanagan Lake. In 2007, Fish was again charged with the murder of Bill Abramenko, a 75-year-old retired carpenter. The Royal Canadian Mounted Police admitted that during the six weeks Fish was at large, no alert was issued by police or the parole board. Fish's arrest ignited a national debate on the role of the Parole Board of Canada. The case lead to widespread changes for the police and the parole board.

Denis Lortie was granted full parole in 1996 after serving 12 years in prison for murdering three people and injuring 13 others. The decision went against the wishes of the victims relatives, although as of 2010, Lortie has not reoffended.

In early 2011 a convicted Quebec fraudster, Vincent Lacroix was released after serving 18 months of his 13-year sentence for stealing over $100 million. Sections 125 and 126 of the Corrections and Conditional Release Act allow a narrow set of non-violent offenders access to parole after serving one sixth of their sentence. As a response to extensive media coverage and public outcry, the Conservative Party of Canada, at the urging of the Bloc Québécois tabled Bill C-59, a law which ended early parole for non-violent offenders.

== Authority ==
An independent administrative tribunal, the Board has the exclusive authority under the Corrections and Conditional Release Act to grant, deny, cancel, terminate or revoke day parole and full parole. In addition, the Board is responsible for making decisions to grant, deny and revoke pardons under the Criminal Records Act and the Criminal Code.

The head of the PBC is a Chairperson who reports to Parliament through the Minister of Public Safety, Democratic Institutions and Intergovernmental Affairs. As an independent agency, the Minister does not direct the operations of the PBC. The annual budget of the PBC is $43 million and the headquarters are located in Ottawa, Ontario with regional offices in Moncton, New Brunswick, Montreal, Quebec, Kingston, Ontario, Saskatoon, Saskatchewan, Abbotsford, British Columbia and Edmonton, Alberta.

Under the Corrections and Conditional Release Act, which governs federal corrections, provinces and territories may establish their own parole boards for offenders sentenced to a term of incarceration of less than two years. Only three provinces now have their own parole boards: Ontario, Alberta and Quebec.

Parole is an option available to most offenders. The offender will have to spend a prescribed amount of time in custody, depending on the offence. For the vast majority of offences, that period is one third of the total sentence imposed.

Parole is not automatic. The parole board must consider, first and foremost, the protection of the public. Secondary considerations are reintegration, rehabilitation and compassion. When life sentences are imposed, eligibility for parole is 25 years in first-degree murder cases, between 10 and 25 years in second-degree murder cases, and 7 years for other life sentences or indeterminate sentences. Any person released on parole from a life sentence or an indeterminate sentence must remain on parole and be subject to parole conditions of the board for the remainder of the offender's life.

For a reflection on the work of a Member of the Parole Board see Lubomyr Luciuk's article in The Toronto Star, "Making parole decisions is one tough job," 23 June 2016.

=== Record Suspensions ===
Under the Criminal Records Act, Section 2.1, the Parole Board of Canada is the administrative tribunal that has the exclusive authority to make decisions regarding Record Suspensions. A Record Suspension is a formal means to remove the disadvantages associated with having a Criminal Record for people that have been convicted of a criminal offence. In order to apply for a Record Suspension an individual must complete an application that is later reviewed by the Board and a decision to grant, or deny the application is made by an officer. Under Section 7, the Parole Board of Canada also has the ability to revoke granted Record Suspensions if there is a breach in good conduct on the part of the applicant or if a person reoffends and commits an indictable offence and even in some cases a summary offence.

== Changes to the pardon process ==
The process of a pardon underwent significant changes in the application in June 2010 as a result of amendments to the Criminal Records Act, through Bill C-23B. Specifically, new waiting periods of 10 years were made for personal injury offences and indictable sexual offences. All other offences fell under a waiting period of 5 years for indicatable offences and 3 years for summary convictions. Additional information was now required for indictable applications, which would detail why they are applying for a pardon, what benefit it would provide and how it would assist their rehabilitation. Applicants would also need to explain changes in their lives since their conviction(s) and give details about what, how and why the offence occurred. The fee was raised at this time from $50 to $150.

In 2012 Bill C-10 was passed which brought further changes to the Criminal Records Act. The term "pardon" was replaced by "record suspension". The reasoning behind this is said to be that "pardon" connotes forgiveness, which the government does not want to appear to have given. The waiting period for convictions increased further to five years for summary convictions, and 10 years for indictable convictions, or those whose method of trial cannot be confirmed. The final big change was the creation of Schedule 1 offences, which is essentially a list of primarily sexual offences against minors. Any person convicted of one of these offences is no longer eligible to apply for a pardon or record suspension, unless they meet some very stringent exceptions. The fee at this time increased substantially in an effort to create a cost recovery model, raising to the current amount of $631.

== See also ==
- Correctional Service of Canada
