= Women's Franchise Act =

1918 Canadian statute

The Women's Franchise Act is an act of the Parliament of Canada. Passed in 1918, the act allowed female citizens of Canada to vote in federal elections. Universal suffrage was not attained in 1918, as women electors had to meet the same requirements as men in order to vote.

== History ==
=== Predecessors ===
In 1917, the federal Wartime Elections Act had increased the number of people who were eligible to vote. The federal Military Voters Act granted the right to vote to about 2,000 women who were military nurses. However, both of these acts disenfranchised those who were conscientious objectors to the war. People who had been born in enemy countries and became British subjects after 1902 were also disenfranchised. An exception was granted to people who had arrived in Canada and emigrated from these countries before they had been annexed by Germany (including those born in France, Italy, and Denmark). Individuals whose first language was deemed to belong to an enemy country, even if they had emigrated from an allied country, were disenfranchised. This act greatly decreased the number of women who could vote during the time.

== See also ==
- Women's suffrage in Canada
- Feminism in Canada
- Dominion Elections Act
