= Canadian coffee regulations =

Canadian coffee regulations are authorized by the Food and Drugs Act and by the Consumer Packaging and Labelling Act, and each's associated regulations. Administered by Health Canada, each agency's regulations apply to all coffee imported to, or processed in, Canada.

Among the rules governing the Canadian coffee trade; green, raw, or unroasted coffee must be grown from arabica, liberica, or robusta coffee seeds. Roasted coffee should contain 10 percent fat, and no more than six percent ash. Decaffeinated coffee should be 0.1 percent caffeine, or 0.3 percent caffeine for instant coffee.
