= Electronic Commerce Protection Act =

Parliament of Canada
- Long title: An Act to promote the efficiency and adaptability of the Canadian economy by regulating certain activities that discourage reliance on electronic means of carrying out commercial activities, and to amend the Canadian Radio-television and Telecommunications Commission Act, the Competition Act, the Personal Information Protection and Electronic Documents Act and the Telecommunications Act
- Bill citation: Bill C-27

The Electronic Commerce Protection Act (French: Loi sur la protection du commerce électronique, ECPA) is anti-spam legislation introduced in 2009 by the Government of Canada at the House of Commons.

== History ==
Spam legislation in Canada was first introduced in 2004 when the Anti‐Spam Action Plan for Canada was launched. The Government of Canada assembled a group of industry representatives, scholars, and experts to examine the problems created by spam in Canada and how to potentially address them. The first Canadian bill directly addressing spam was Senator Yoine Goldstein’s Bill S‐202. Bill S-202 was introduced in 2008 and sought to prohibit unsolicited commercial messages, requiring explicit consent from the recipient. In 2009, the Minister of Industry, Tony Clement, introduced Bill C‐27 or the Electronic Commerce Protection Act (ECPA). The ECPA died on the order paper in December 2009, after the bill cleared the House of Commons committee. The ECPA was quickly re‐introduced as the Fighting Internet and Wireless Spam Act, Bill C‐28 ("FISA") – a name that more closely reflected the original political message of the Conservative Party of Canada (May 25, 2010).

Finally, December 15, 2010, the Government of Canada passed the Fighting the Internet and Wireless Spam Bill. The coming into force of the ECPA had been delayed for three and a half years because of very intense lobbying efforts by industry groups. The Electronic Commerce Protection Act (SPAM bill) selectively came into effect on July 1, 2014. Because of ongoing fierce lobbying other parts of the Act relating to the unsolicited installation of computer programs was delayed until January 15, 2015.

== Government information ==
The government website offers insight and detailed information on both the implementation and the enforcement of spam legislation. According to the Canadian government, the Canadian Radio-television and Telecommunications Commission (CRTC) will be the enforcement agency and issue administrative monetary penalties for violations of the spam legislation. Additionally, the Competition Bureau is supposed to seek "administrative monetary penalties and criminal sanctions under the Competition Act." The Office of the Privacy Commissioner is given "new powers under an amended Personal Information Protection and Electronic Documents Act" (PIPEDA).

== Purpose ==
The purpose of the Act is "to promote the efficiency and adaptability of the Canadian economy by regulating commercial conduct that discourages the use of electronic means to carry out commercial activities because that conduct:

- (a) impairs the availability, reliability, efficiency and optimal use of electronic means to carry out commercial activities;
- (b) imposes additional costs on businesses and consumers;
- (c) compromises privacy and the security of confidential information; and
- (d) undermines the confidence of Canadians in the use of electronic means of communication to carry out their commercial activities in Canada and abroad."

=== Penalties ===
The maximum penalty for a violation is "$1,000,000 in the case of an individual and $10,000,000 in the case of any other person."

=== Regulations ===
The following provisions will come into force with the implementation of the anti-spam laws: Liable persons include but are not limited to employees acting in the scope of their employment. "An officer, director, agent or mandatory of a corporation that commits a violation is liable for the violation if they directed, authorized, assented to, acquiesced in or participated in the commission of the violation, whether or not the corporation is proceeded against."

== Lobbying ==
Intense industrial lobbying efforts against this bill by a number of paid lobbyists from marketing survey companies, real estate agencies, or copyright stakeholders include changes to the bill to counter fears that bill C-28 might interfere with their ability to seek or attract new potential customers or affect the growth of businesses. The bill was challenged by businesses that are built on strong relationships with clients, for example, real estate agents. While the Liberal Party agrees that the ECPA restricts businesses in a number of ways, they support the ECPA because it restricts spam.
