= Made in Canada =

Product label certification mark

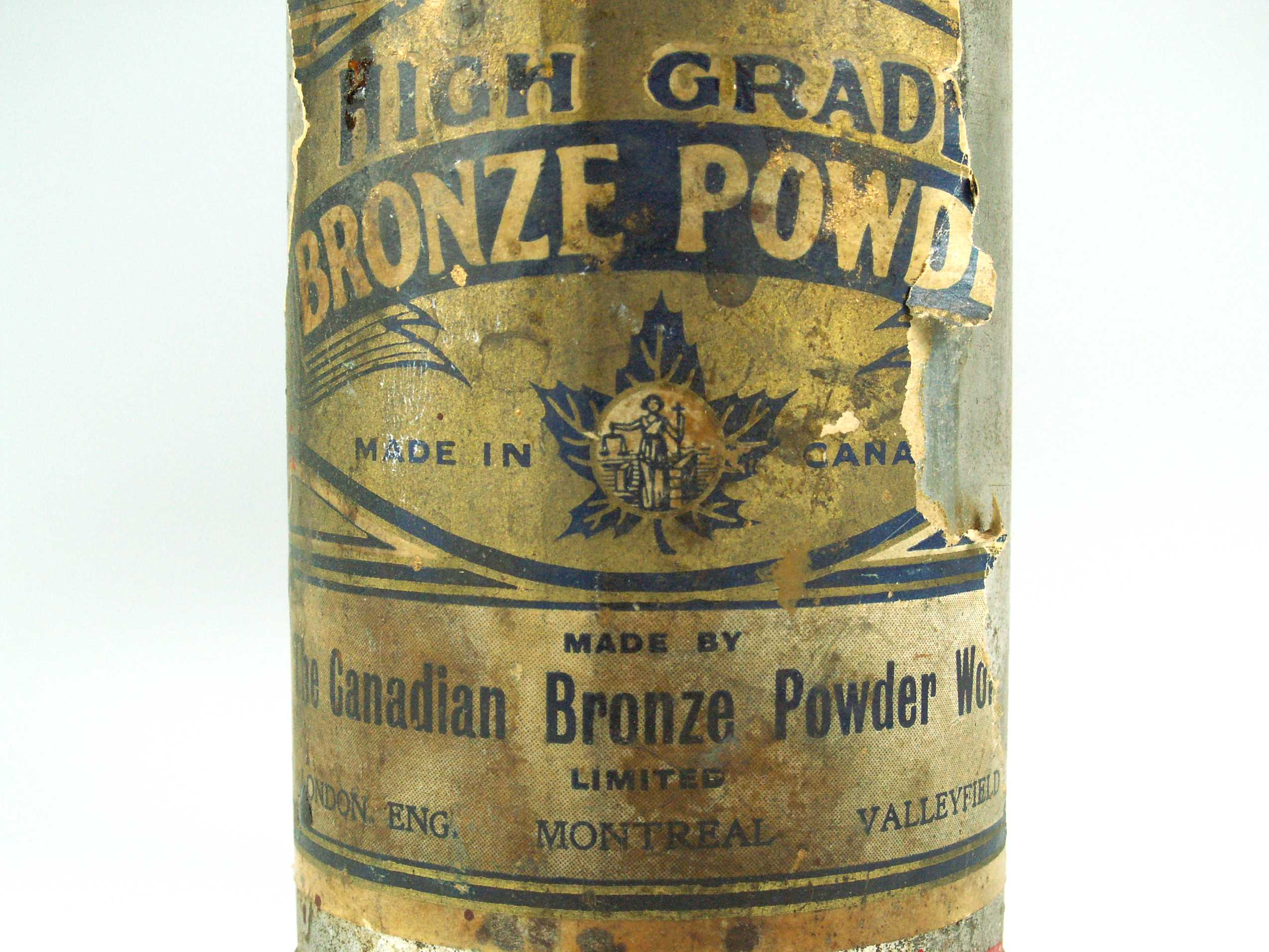
A 1940s tin of bronze powder displaying "Made in Canada" at the centre of the partially torn label

Made in Canada (French: Fabriqué au Canada) and Product of Canada (Produit du Canada) are certification marks designating a claim that Canada is the country of origin of a good. A product label for that good may use these marks, or a qualified version, to present that claim to consumers. The certification marks are voluntary within Canada but may be required on exported goods, to comply with the laws of the country of export.

The most recent domestic regulations came into force on 1 January 2009. These state that the last substantial transformation of the good must occur in Canada and that a minimum percentage of the total direct costs of creation must be incurred in Canada: 51% for "Made in Canada" and 98% for "Product of Canada" marking. The legislation is enforced domestically by the Competition Bureau, the Canada Food Inspection Agency (CFIA) and Health Canada.

== Label ==
An example of a "Made in Canada" label design

Product labels may use the term "Product of Canada" if at least 98 percent of the total direct costs to create the good are incurred in Canada. This includes "all or virtually all" of the ingredients, components, processing, labour, and manufacturing costs. Moreover, the "last substantial transformation" must have been executed in Canada, with the product being processed from its constituent ingredients or components into a new product. (Note: For example, multiple vegetables may be combined into a packaged salad.) The claim "Canadian" is considered equivalent to "Product of Canada" and must meet the same requirements, as do implied declarations like "Proudly Canadian" or "Buy Canadian" and Canadian symbols like the flag or maple leaf.

For a product to have a "Made in Canada" label, it must also satisfy the "last substantial transformation" criterion, with at least 51 percent of the total direct costs of the product's creation occurring in Canada.

A food product made in Canada using ingredients imported from other countries must use qualifying statements on labels, such as "Made in Canada with imported ingredients", or "Made in Canada from domestic and imported ingredients" if it also includes ingredients from Canadian sources.

Other labels with less stringent Canadian content thresholds include "Canned in Canada", "Distilled in Canada", "Packaged in Canada", "Prepared in Canada", "Processed in Canada", "Refined in Canada", "Roasted in Canada", and many others that may specify the type of processing that occurred in Canada for the final good.

Before 2018, labels for imported produce were required to include all countries of origin for the contents contained in the package, per the Fresh Fruit and Vegetable Regulations. (Note: The Fresh Fruit and Vegetable Regulations (CRC, c. 285) was repealed in 2018.) In 2019, the Canadian Food Inspection Agency (CFIA) initiated a public consultation for potential changes to the "Product of Canada" and "Made in Canada" label regulations.

The term "100% Canadian" may only be used as a label on products for which all ingredients are sourced in Canada, and all processing and labour occurs in Canada.

In April 2020, the CFIA temporarily suspended low-risk activities during the COVID-19 pandemic in Canada, including relaxing enforcement of labelling guidelines for food products so long as the products meet Canadian food safety standards, do not make false or deceptive claims, and include a specified set of labelling data.

Products being exported from Canada must meet the requirements of the importing country for marks and labelling, which may differ from Canada's domestic guidelines.

== History ==
Canadian legislation regarding country-of-origin marks began in the late 19th century in response to import laws and practices of Great Britain and the United States. (Note: The U.S. Tariff Act of 1890 first required imported products to bear country-of-origin marks.) Charles Tupper said during this period that protection of domestic industry was the "national policy", and legislation had the aims of preventing fraud and benefiting industry without becoming a hindrance. For example, the Dairy Products Act, 1893, prohibited any cheese or butter being marked "Canada" unless it was made in Canada. (Note: Prof. James Wilson Robertson, Commissioner of Dairying, held that it was not then uncommon for low-quality US cheese to be brought into Canada then exported with a fraudulent "Canada" mark.) Following thorough consultation with industry stakeholders, the Dairy Act, 1897, required producers to register and to mark with "Canada" or "Canadian" all cheese or butter intended for export.

Regulations addressed consumers with the 1970 Consumer Packaging and Labeling Act, (Note: Additional regulations for specific industries include the Textile Labelling Act, the Precious Metals Marking Act, the Food and Drugs Act and the Safe Food for Canadians Act.) which prohibits any false or misleading representation likely to deceive a consumer. This specifically includes claims of product origin. Administration came under the authority of the Competition Bureau, the law-enforcement arm of the Department of Industry. The Bureau views misinformation and deceptive practises as an unfair advantage in the marketplace, and does not have a mandate to inform consumers. While it has authority over deceptive marketing across all goods and services, the Bureau has generally allowed the CFIA and Health Canada to enforce the Act with regard to food and drugs.

The Bureau's guideline for Canadian-origin claims was 51% of domestic content, with the product's last substantial transformation in Canada. In July 2010, the Bureau brought in new guidelines drawing a distinction between "Made in Canada" and "Product of Canada", with the latter requiring 98% of the total direct costs to be domestic. Made in Canada claims required a qualifying statement for any imported materials, and the guidelines advised on the use of other terms and national symbols.

== Reactions ==
The 2010 regulation changes were met with criticism. The 98% threshold did not appear to have significant public support, and a House of Commons committee had recommended an increase to 85% for food products. Bruce Cran, president of Consumers' Association of Canada, felt that the standards would not be understood by most consumers, and that 51% was too low a threshold. Jean-Michel Laurin of business association Canadian Manufacturers & Exporters noted that the supply chains of modern flexible production systems can source materials from different places, and doubted that companies would find it worthwhile to claim Canadian origin. Brad Cherniak of Sapient Capital Partners said that carrying the Made in Canada mark gave no advantage to most products and could be "a public relations nightmare" if a business was forced to remove it.

Professor Walid Hejazi found that it was difficult to determine value-added percentages from each country. He noted that domestic branding and design work could, in some cases, exceed the costs of physical manufacturing overseas, and qualify an otherwise foreign product for a Made in Canada mark. Robert Ott, chair of Ryerson University's School of Fashion, felt that Made in Canada labels on clothing were misleading and more about marketing and perception than reality, noting that Canada no longer manufactures the textiles from which clothing is made.

A 2017 documentary series My life Made in Canada followed journalist Frédéric Choinière as he sought to live for a year entirely on Made in Canada or Product of Canada goods. (Note: Exceptions were Choinière's computer and mobile phone, for which no Canadian equivalents exist.) He found it to be easier than he had thought, with his most difficult and time-consuming decisions related to food.

== Fraud ==
Fraudulent use of a "Made in Canada" label may lead to penalties or fines. A company making fraudulent claims about the Canadian origin of goods may incur fines of up to $10 million, and an individual may incur fines of up to $750,000.

In a 2005 report commissioned by the Canadian Agri-Food Policy Institute, the second most-cited issue by interviewed horticulture stakeholders involved claims of fraudulent quality or origin labelling.

In 2017, food supply company Mucci International Marketing was fined $1.5 million by the Canada Food Inspection Agency, $3.2 million by the not-for-profit greenhouse industry trade group Ontario Greenhouse Vegetable Growers, and placed on probation for five years for making fraudulent claims about the origin of some of its vegetables.

== Commerce ==
A study published by the Business Development Bank of Canada in October 2013 stated that, of consumers who purchased local produce, most did so to support the local economy, support local farms, and create local jobs. About 30 percent of respondents stated they were willing to pay a premium of up to 15 percent for Canadian produce.

== Branding ==
In 2014, the federal government formed a private-sector steering committee to develop a privately funded Made in Canada branding campaign. Finance Minister Jim Flaherty consulted with the leaders of the successful Australian Made campaign. Economics professor Dan Trefler called the branding campaign "nothing but political pandering", and unlikely to further change the minds of domestic shoppers or foreign importers.

Agriculture and Agri-Food Canada conducted a food industry survey to determine why the labels "Product of Canada" and "Made in Canada" was not widely used by Canadian food producers, stating that respondents found the "threshold was too restrictive when minor ingredients" were involved in the production. (Note: For example, the use of sugar or vinegar (both imported products) would disqualify many products from carrying the label "Product of Canada".)

The proposal to update the regulations is also intended as part of a broader strategy to create a Canada brand for agricultural products.

== See also ==
- Manufacturing in Canada
- United Food and Commercial Workers Union (UFCW)
