= Crow Rate =

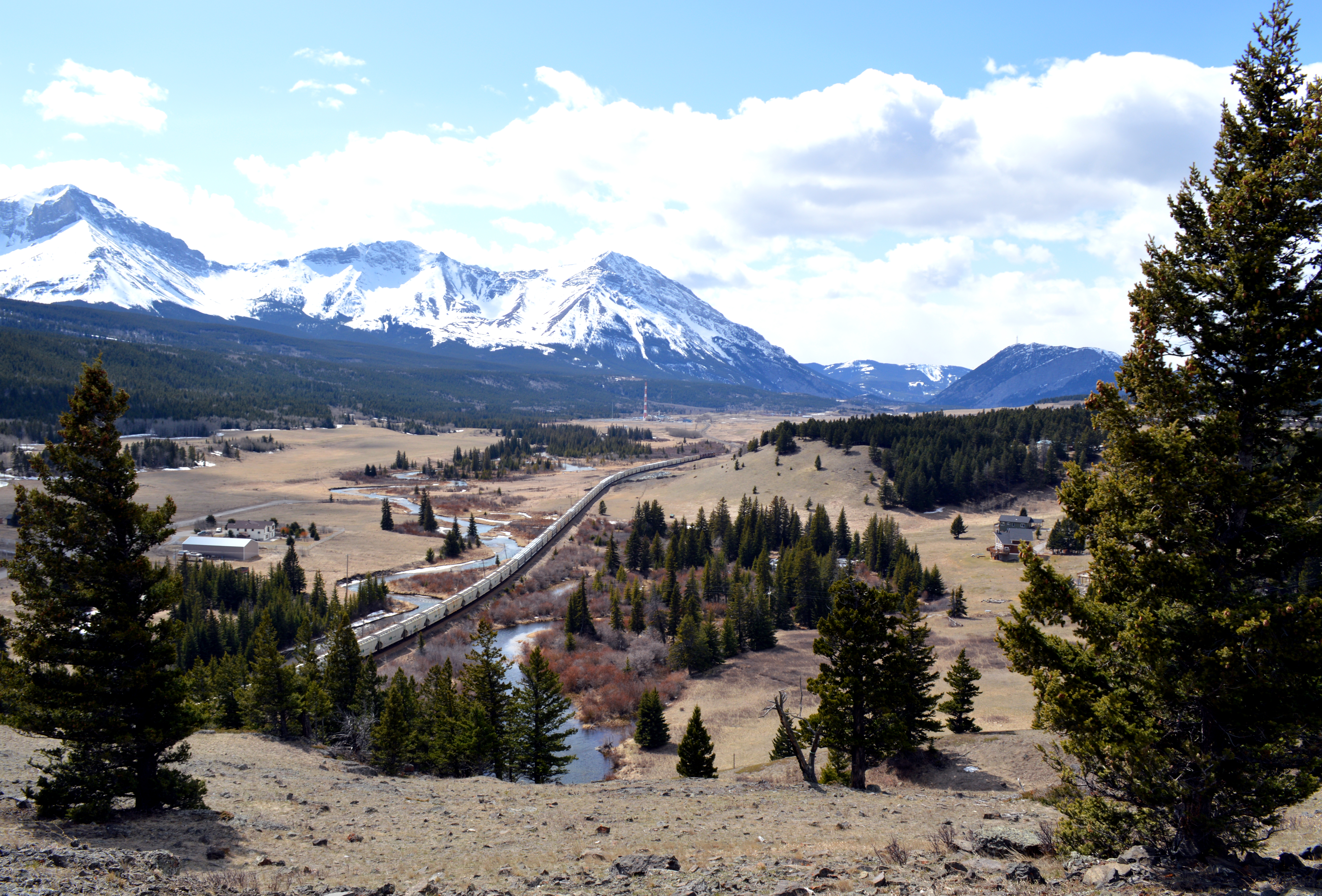
A train heads west into Crowsnest Pass from Coleman, Alberta

The Crow Rate, or Crowsnest Freight Rate, was a railway transportation subsidy benefiting farmers on the Canadian Prairies and manufacturers in central Canada by rate requirements imposed on the Canadian Pacific Railway (CPR) by the Government of Canada in exchange for financing and other benefits.

== Origin ==
In the late 19th century, mineral strikes in southeastern BC near Nelson, Ainsworth, Rossland, Kaslo, Kimberley and Moyie inspired American railway interests to push lines northward, to transport ore and to provide machinery and supplies needed for the development of local smelters. Both the Canadian government and the CPR wanted an all-Canadian rail line to forestall this American access and to reassert Canadian sovereignty in the area. A line was planned from Lethbridge, Alberta, to Kootenay Landing near Nelson, British Columbia, through Crowsnest Pass, which would also enable the development of coal deposits in the pass and the Elk River valley, important both for mineral smelting operations and for the CPR's conversion of locomotives from wood to coal.

The CPR needed government funding and concessions for the construction of this line, and the negotiated agreement between the CPR and the Canadian government was contained in the "Crowsnest Pass Agreement" dated September 6, 1897. Amongst other things, the CPR agreed to provide reduced rail rates for farmers' grain shipped east to the Great Lakes and for farm machinery shipped west from central Canada "forever".

The Crow Rate was suspended by the CPR during the First World War and reinstated in 1922.

== End of "forever" ==
Although popular with farmers exporting grains, these reduced rates were not cost-effective for the railway and afforded central Canadian manufacturers and grain ports with an unfair advantage. By the early 1980s, the government attempted to resolve the problems between the competing interests by altering the agreement. The Western Grain Transportation Act of 1983 allowed shipping rates to increase, but never more than 10% of the world price for grain. In addition, further cash payments were made by the government to the CPR.

When the 1993 Canadian federal election resulted in a Liberal government led by Jean Chrétien, the new government took steps to eliminate the subsidies altogether. This was implemented in 1995 through the Western Grain Transition Payment Program, which provided one-time payments to farmers to assist them in making the transition away from subsidized shipping.
