= Western Grain Transportation Act =

Parliament of Canada
- Long title: An Act to provide authority to make transition payments to owners of farmland in Western Canada on which grain is grown
- Citation: S.C. 1995, c. 17, Sch. II
- Royal assent: 1983
- Repealed: 1995

Related legislation
- Canada Transportation Act
- Status: Repealed

The Western Grain Transportation Act (French: Loi sur les paiements de transition du grain de l’Ouest) was a 1983 Canadian federal statute under which the formula for calculating a transport subsidy was modified. The subsidy, informally called the Crow Rate, Crow benefit or Crow subsidy, had been provided since 1897 by the Government of Canada to assist the rail transportation of specified grains and grain products to specified destinations within Canada for export. Since the producer paid only a portion of the freight rate, the Act had the effect of increasing the prices received by grain producers and paid by livestock producers on the prairies. The subsidy encouraged the movement of grain east and west to export shipping terminals.

The Act was abolished as part of budget balancing initiatives undertaken in 1995. Subsequently, grain began moving south for transhipment through the United States.

== See also ==
- Rail transport in Canada
- List of acts of the Parliament of Canada
