= Office of the Pardon Attorney =

Key adviser to the president on clemency

The Office of the Pardon Attorney (OPA), part of the United States Department of Justice, assists the president of the United States in his exercise of executive clemency as authorized by Article II, Section 2, of the US Constitution. The office is headed by the pardon attorney. It operates under the general oversight of the deputy attorney general and in consultation with the attorney general or their delegate to review and process clemency applications.

Under the Constitution, the president's clemency power extends only to federal criminal offenses. All requests for executive clemency for federal offenses are directed to the Office of the Pardon Attorney for investigation and review. The pardon attorney prepares the department's recommendation to the president for final disposition of each application.

Since 1853, the responsibility of advising the president on pardon petitions has been assigned to the attorney general. Over time, various offices have supported this role in managing the clemency process, including the Office of the Pardon Clerk (1865–1870), the Office of the Attorney in Charge of Pardons (1891–1894). In 1894, the current Office of the Pardon Attorney was established.

Executive clemency may take several forms, including pardon, conditional pardon, commutation of sentence, conditional commutation of sentence, remission of fine or restitution, respite, reprieve and amnesty. A pardon may be posthumous. The Office of the Pardon Attorney currently has a staff that includes the deputy pardon attorney, an executive officer, four staff attorneys, and its clerical staff and paralegals who assist in the review of petitions.

The power of clemency is "one of the most unlimited powers bestowed on the president by the Constitution".

== History ==
Since 1789 various offices within the federal government have provided the president with administrative support for the exercise of executive clemency. A presidential order in 1865 formally delegated this responsibility to the Department of Justice. The office's current name was adopted in 1894.

Historically, the norm was for presidents to rely on the pardon attorney process before making pardons, but they are not required to do so.

== Pardoning standards ==
When the president proposes to exercise his or her executive clemency, the case is directed to the Office of the Pardon Attorney for review.

There are five standards for someone to be considered to be pardoned. Generally, the petitioner must be in a good standing during their sentence and must wait a period of at least five years before applying to pardon. However, this five-year wait period can be waived.

The first standard is how the person's conduct, character, and reputation have been during conviction. This means that the individuals conducted themselves as responsible and knowledgeable people who are aware of their crime and are ready to return to normal society. They must have the potential to create a better society by achieving employment, providing for themselves and loved ones, as well as keeping a clean criminal background. A very recent example of this would be when President Trump commuted 63-year-old Alice Marie Johnson's sentence after the case was brought up by celebrity Kim Kardashian. The White House described their reasoning for the pardon by stating "while this administration will always be very tough on crime, it believes that those who have paid their debt to society and worked hard to better themselves while in prison deserve a second chance".

Second is the seriousness and when the offense occurred. When the offense is years in the past and did not affect many people, the chance to achieve a pardon is much greater than if the offense was very recent and a high crime. Things that must be considered include how the victims would deal with the pardon, and how it will set a precedent for future similar crimes. During his presidency, President Barack Obama granted clemency 1,715 times. Most of these were for nonviolent drug offenders, in an effort to get non-serious offenders out of prison and to reverse the negative outcomes from the war on drugs.

Third is the individual's acceptance of responsibility and self-awareness of how serious their actions were. The individual's behavior, if they are creating excuses or reasons why they committed the crime, will greatly lower the chances of pardon. If the individual desires forgiveness and portrays complete responsibility for their actions, then the chances are much higher. Generally, every person who is considered for a pardon exudes these behaviors.

Fourth is the legal disabilities the individual suffered from the conviction. Someone like a lawyer or doctor may have lost their licenses as a result of their conviction. This may grant reason to consider a pardon. Though pardons for this type of relief are minimal and very rare, they will not be put at a higher priority over an otherwise deserving person who has a desire for forgiveness. An example of this would be when President Andrew Johnson pardoned Samuel Mudd in 1869. Mudd was imprisoned because he treated John Wilkes Booth's leg after Booth assassinated President Lincoln in 1865. This crime was not very serious, considering Mudd claimed he was unaware of Booth's actions at the time and he was doing what his profession entailed.

Lastly, referrals and recommendations from people in powerful positions like politicians, attorneys, judges, and even victims are looked over carefully to decide if an individual is worthy of a pardon. A controversial pardon was President Bill Clinton pardoning his half-brother, Roger Clinton Jr., for cocaine possession and trafficking convictions.

=== Posthumous pardons ===
Posthumous pardons are rare because it is generally Department of Justice policy to not accept requests for non-living persons. This is due to the limited resources and personnel at the Department of Justice, and cases involving living persons take precedence over those who are deceased. The same procedure and reasoning are applied to clemency applications for federal misdemeanors, giving precedent to cases involving federal felony convictions. This structure is designed to allow the DOJ to devote its time to those who will receive the greatest benefit from Federal clemency. Only presidents Clinton, George W. Bush, Trump and Biden have granted posthumous pardons.

== Steps and process ==
The Office of the Pardon Attorney handles all and every clemency related correspondence and issue, including petitions and applications. This involves several steps. The office receives and reviews clemency correspondences, and investigates applications along with the files sent with them to make more valid the petitioner's plea for pardoning. It then prepares a recommendation for each application, and sends it to the president for his final decision as to whether or not to grant a pardon.

For 125 years, the key adviser to the president on clemency has been the Department of Justice's Office of the Pardon Attorney (PARDON) which normally reviews all requests for pardons.

Based on government data, lawyers, advocates for criminal justice advocates, and former officials from both the White House and pardon, President Trump regularly bypassed the pardon attorney, according to a 2020 investigation by The Washington Post. Unlike previous presidents, Trump has granted clemency to "well-connected offenders who had not filed petitions with the pardon office or did not meet its requirements", leading to an increase in the number of pardons granted in recent years.
