= Dominion Elections Act =

Act of the Parliament of Canada

Parliament of Canada
- Long title: An Act respecting the Election of Members of the House of Commons and the Electoral Franchise
- Citation: S.C. 1920 (10 & 11 Geo V), c. 46
- Enacted by: House of Commons of Canada
- Enacted: June 29, 1920
- Enacted by: Senate of Canada
- Assented to: July 1, 1920

Legislative history

First chamber: House of Commons of Canada
- Bill title: 12
- Introduced by: Hugh Guthrie
- First reading: March 11, 1920
- Second reading: March 25–26, 1920
- Third reading: June 28, 1920

Second chamber: Senate of Canada
- Bill title: 12
- Member(s) in charge: James Alexander Lougheed
- First reading: June 29, 1920
- Second reading: N/A
- Third reading: June 29, 1920

Repeals
- Military Voters Act; Wartime Elections Act

Amended by
- SC 1921 (11 & 12 Geo V), c 29; SC 1925 (15 & 16 Geo V), c 42; SC 1929 (19 & 20 Geo V), c 40; SC 1930 (20 & 21 Geo V), c 16

Repealed by
- Dominion Elections Act, 1932

Related legislation
- Canada Elections Act
- Status: Repealed

The Dominion Elections Act (French: Acte des élections fédérales du Dominion) was a bill passed by the House of Commons of Canada in 1920, under Robert Borden's Unionist government. The Act allowed white women to run for the Parliament of Canada. However, women from most/all minorities, for example, Aboriginals and Asians, were not granted these rights. This bill was passed in part due to the advocacy of Nellie McClung, a women's rights activist from Manitoba.

The law established the agency now known as Elections Canada with the position of Chief Electoral Officer as head of the agency.

== Background ==
During World War I, the country was split on the issue of conscription. Ahead of the 1917 election, the Liberal Party experienced splits among individual MPs. Protests erupted over the government's plan to introduce conscription, which became known as the Conscription Crisis of 1917. Pro-conscription Liberals joined forces with the Conservative Party to form the Unionist Party in 1917, led by Prime Minister Robert Borden.

In an effort to increase votes for the new Unionist Party, Borden granted the vote to female relatives of active-duty soldiers. The 1917 election had the highest female voter turnout out of any other election, and the Unionist Party won a safe majority, with only Quebec voting majority Liberal.

== Main Points ==
Voter rights are starting to be developed in this Act. One such part is section 5, which forces employers to allow every elector in their employment at least 2 extra hours for voting, with no deduction in pay. The only exception to this was if they worked within the Government Railways as a conductor, or otherwise engaged in the running of trains, as to not delay the train schedule. This allowed voters who would otherwise have no time to vote to do so with time to spare.

This Act was the first to allow women to legally vote. This right was defined in section 29. This section states that anyone, male or female, can vote if they are at least 21 years old, are British by birth or naturalization, and have resided in Canada for at least 12 months. This section also explicitly states that "Indians" (or First Nations) are not allowed to vote. However, this Act allowed any "Indians" who had served in the Canadian Armed Forces to vote. This was the first time that the First Nations people had the ability to vote without giving up their Indian status or treaty rights, but this only extended to men.

Section 30 is the template for disqualifying electors, meaning it describes who is, and is not, allowed to vote. The disqualifications are as follows:

- The judges of every court whose appointment rests with the Governor in Council, during their tenure of office
- The Chief Electoral Officer, during his tenure of office
- Persons disfranchised for corrupt or illegal practices under this Act, during the period of their disenfranchisement
- Persons disfranchised under the Disenfranchising Act, during the period of their disenfranchisement
- Persons who, at the time of the election, have committed any corrupt practice or illegal practice, for the whole period of the election at which they have so offended
- Persons who, at the time of an election, are prisoners undergoing punishment for criminal offences, or are patients in lunatic asylums, or are maintained in whole or in part as inmate receiving public charitable support or care in municipal poor houses or houses of industry, or are inmate receiving public charitable support in any institution receiving aid from the government of a province under any statute in that behalf, for the whole period of such election
- Persons who, by the laws of any such province in Canada, are disqualified from voting for a member of the Legislative Assembly of such province in respect of race, shall not be qualified to vote in such a province under the provisions of this act

Most of the disqualifications listed are the same as those in our current laws, aside from some changes in wording and specifics, such as inmates not being able to vote. However, the very last one listed is unlike our current legislation. The last one means that, in the province where they live, if they are not allowed to vote for a member of the Legislative Assembly due to their race, they are not allowed to vote in the federal election for that same reason. However, if that person had served in the Canadian Armed Forces, that is the only exception to this rule, and they are allowed to vote.

Sections 61 and 62 allow people with impaired vision to vote and outline how it should be done. Previously, those with impaired vision were not allowed to have anyone help them, or else they would have been guilty of a summary offence. These sections allowed people with vision impairment to vote with the help of the Deputy Returning Officer.

== See also ==
- Canada Elections Act
- Women's Franchise Act
