= Maria Barrados =

Canadian government official

- Education: University of Saskatchewan McGill University Carleton University
- Occupation: President of the Public Service Commission of Canada
- Years active: 1993-2003
- Predecessor: Scott Serson
- Successor: Anne-Marie Robinson

Maria Barrados is a Canadian government official. She is the former president of the Public Service Commission of Canada and chair of Accreditation Canada International. She is currently an Executive-in-Residence at the Sprott School of Business at Carleton University, and partner at Barrados Consulting Inc. Barrados also serves on various board and advisory committees for public service reform, evaluation and measurement, and human resource management.

== Career ==
Barrados was the manager of evaluation at Atomic Energy of Canada Limited from 1977 to 1984. She started her career in the Canadian Government as the Chief of Educational Statistics Analysis in the Education Support Branch in 1984. In 1985, she joined the Office of the Auditor General as the Director of Audit Operations, and was promoted to Principal in 1988. Barrados served as the Assistant Auditor General from 1993 to 2003, before becoming the interim President of the Public Service Commission of Canada in 2003. She was confirmed President in 2004 and served until 2011.

== Volunteer work ==
Barrados serves on various Advisory Boards including at the Sprott School of Business and Confucius Institute at Carleton University, and is also a member of the Rothwell Heights Community Association.

She has previously served as the Vice-Chair on the Board of Directors of the Praxis Spinal Cord Institute from 2014-2020.

== Education ==
Barrados received an Honours Bachelor of Arts in Sociology from the University of Saskatchewan in 1966. She also holds an MA in Sociology from McGill University (1970) and a PhD in Sociology from Carleton University in 1978.

== Publications ==
- Barrados, M. (Ed.), Lonsdale, J. (Ed.). (2020). Crossover of Audit and Evaluation Practices. New York: Routledge, https://doi.org/10.4324/9781003021025
- Barrados, Maria. (2020). The Practices of Audit and Evaluation. 10.4324/9781003021025-6.
- Barrados, Maria. (2018). Challenges for Governance in Partnerships for Delivering Services 1: The Partnership Dimension. 10.4324/9781351323925-16.
- Barrados, Maria & Blain, J.. (2013). Improving Program Results Through the Use of Predictive Operational Performance Indicators A Canadian Case Study. American Journal of Evaluation. 34. 45-56. 10.1177/1098214012464426.
- Barrados, Maria & Mayne, John. (2004). Les organisations du secteur public peuvent-elles apprendre ?. Revue de l'OCDE sur la gestion budgétaire. 3. 17-17. 10.1787/budget-v3-art17-fr.
- Barrados, M. & Mayne, John & Wileman, T.. (2000). Accountability for Collaborative Programme Delivery Arrangements in Canada's Federal Government: Some Consequences of Sharing the Business of Government. International Review of Administrative Sciences - INT REV ADM SCI. 66. 495-511. 10.1177/0020852300663008.
