= Bill C-36 =

Bill C-36 refers to various legislation introduced into the House of Commons of Canada, including:

- Anti-Terrorism Act, introduced in 2001 to the first session of the 37th Parliament
- Canada Consumer Product Safety Act, introduced in 2010 to the third session of the 40th Parliament
- Protection of Communities and Exploited Persons Act, introduced in 2014 to the second session of the 41st Parliament
- An Act to amend the Statistics Act, introduced in 2016 to the only session of the 42nd Parliament
