= Public Service Commission of Canada =

Government agency

The Public Service Commission of Canada (PSC; French: Commission de la fonction publique du Canada) is an independent government agency that safeguards merit-based hiring, non-partisanship, representativeness of Canada's diversity, and the use of both official languages (English and French) in the Canadian public service. The PSC aims to protect the integrity of hiring and promotion within the public service. As well, the Commission works to protect the political impartiality and non-partisanship of public servants. The Commission develops staffing policies and provides guidance to public service managers and recruits Canadians into the public service. To ensure the staffing system in the government is properly maintained, the PSC has the authority to audit and investigate to ensure departments and managers make improvements. While typical government departments are headed by Ministers, the PSC is an independent agency that is headed by a President who reports to the Canadian Parliament.

== Mandate and goals ==
The PSC has the mandate to appoint people to the public service, and to promote people within the government which can in turn be delegated to deputy heads (often referred to as Deputy Ministers in Canada). The PSC can also assist government departments with recruitment and assessment services. The PSC oversees the integrity of the hiring and promotion system, and makes sure that the hiring process is not compromised by partisan interference from elected officials. Part of this overseeing role involves collecting and analyzing data on hiring and promotion in the public service (e.g., hiring of different groups, by region, by department). As well, the PSC performs audits across the staffing system, examining hiring and promotion files, to ensure that employees are hired and promoted based on merit. Lastly, the PSC administers the Part VII of Public Service Employment Act that recognizes the rights of public service employees to engage in political activities while maintaining the principle of political impartiality in the public service.

The mission of the PSC is to achieve "A highly competent, non-partisan and representative Public Service, able to provide services in both official languages and in which employment practices are characterized by fairness, access, representativeness and transparency

== Program activities ==
The PSC has set out four program activities that are done to reach its strategic outcome:

- The Appointment Integrity and Political Neutrality activity (policies and standards on safeguarding the integrity of hiring and promotion and political neutrality issues)
- The Oversight of Integrity of Staffing and Political Neutrality (makes sure that the integrity of public service hiring and promotion is protected and safeguards the political neutrality of public servants)
- The Staffing Services and Assessment activity (provides managers with tools to help them assess and select employment applicants).
- The Internal Services program activity (corporate management and planning frameworks for the Management Accountability Framework, finance, internal staff, information technology, communications, and other administrative and general support).

== Public Service Employment Act ==
The 2003 Public Service Employment Act (which came into force on December 31, 2005) emphasizes the values of merit, non-partisanship, fairness, access, transparency and representativeness.

Merit refers to the use of essential qualifications during the hiring and promotion process. This means that people who are hired and promoted in the public service must possess certain competencies, skills, and experience (merit), rather than based on political connections or partisan affiliations (political patronage). The merit principle requires that every person who is appointed to the public service has met the essential qualifications and requirements established for the position. The essential requirements can include official language proficiency, asset qualifications, operational requirements (e.g., availability to do shift work or work on weekends), and organizational needs (e.g., need to increase the hiring of women) that have been identified by the head of a department or agency.

Non-partisanship means that appointments of people to the public service (and promotions of public servants )have to be made without political influence from Ministers or partisan officials. Although Canadian public servants were disallowed any involvement in political activities in their private time throughout much of the 20th century, in 1967, legislative changes allowed public servants to request permission to take leave without pay to run in an election. In 1991, a Supreme Court decision gave public servants the right to engage in political activities. The 2003 Public Service Employment Act clarified what political activities public servants are allowed to engage in.

Public servants can engage in political activities such as supporting a candidate in an election or taking leave without pay to run in an election, but they have to maintain their political impartiality as public servants. In order to comply with the non-partisanship values in the Act, public servants must only do the types of political activities that do not conflict or impair their ability to fulfill their responsibilities in a politically impartial manner. The type and degree of political activities that a public servant can engage in depends on several factors, such as the visibility of the political activities that the public servant wants to engage in and the visibility of the public servant in their job in the public service.

== Historical timeline ==
- Before responsible government, Canada had no real civil service; government officials were appointed by either the Crown or its provincial representatives. These officials usually served for an unspecified period ("during the pleasure of the Crown") for as long as they were deemed fit for the position.
- 1849 - When responsible government began in 1849, there was a recognition that the roles of the political and non-political government officials needed to be defined and distinguished from one another.
- 1868 - The Canada Civil Service Act was enacted
- 1882 - The "Civil Service Act" of 1882 created a process for examining candidates for the civil service, with a Board of Civil Service Examiners
- 1908 - The Civil Service Amendment Act created the Civil Service Commission, an independent body to oversee appointments to government positions in Ottawa (this was called the "inside service", in contrast to the public service outside the capital).
- 1918 - The Civil Service Act 1918 set in place merit-based appointments and reinforced the independence of the Commission. It also brought the "outside service" (the public service outside of Ottawa) under the domain of the Commission, along with greater oversight with regards to appointments and promotions for members of the "inside service".
- 1920s - The Commission developed its competitive system of examinations for appointment and promotion (a merit system) as a viable alternative to the patronage system.
- 1921 - This year formal restrictions were created against the employment of married women in civil service jobs. Women already holding permanent positions who married had to resign. These restrictions were removed in 1955.
- 1924 - The Civil Service Superannuation Act was intended to promote and protect a career in civil service.
- 1932 - Staff control regulations are established and Treasury Board is given authority over the Civil Service Commission's staffing responsibilities.
- 1949 - The number of World War II veterans assigned to positions in the civil service under the statutory veterans preference rises to 55,000.
- 1951 - The Financial Administration Act of 1951 provided final authority to the Treasury Board for management (administration and organization) of the public service.
- 1955 - In 1921 formal restrictions were created against the employment of married women in civil service jobs. Women already holding permanent positions who married had to resign. These restrictions were removed in 1955.
- 1957 - The CSC established the Pay Research Bureau to provide objective information on rates of pay and conditions of employment in government and industry, and to recommend salary rates for civil servants.
- 1961 - The new Civil Service Act of 1961 gave civil servants the right of appeal against not only promotions, but also transfers, demotions, suspensions and dismissals.
- 1962 - The Government adopted recommendations by the Royal Commission on Government Organization (Glassco Commission) on the management of the Public Service, including delegating authority to departments to manage their own personnel and to be held accountable for efficient performance.
- 1966 - Bilingualism became an element of merit in the national capital area.
- 1967 - The Public Service Employment Act (PSEA) and Public Service Staff Relations Act (PSSRA) came into effect. The PSEA gave the renamed Public Service Commission the responsibility for all the elements of the staffing process. The PSSRA created a collective bargaining regime in the civil service.
- Early 1970s - There was an expansion of the public service.
- Late 1970s - There was a significant reduction of the public service.
- 1979 - The Bilingualism Bonus was introduced for public servants who met the bilingual language requirements of their positions.
- 1984 - The Commission on Equality in Employment issued its report, which recommended that targets and not quotas are the most effective means of achieving equity in the employment of members of under-represented groups.
- 1986 - Further employment layoff programs again reduced the public service.
- 1992 - The Public Service Reform Act amended both the PSEA and the Public Service Staff Relations Act. This provided more flexibility for managers to respond quickly to changing operational needs or to allow employees to acquire new skills. The Act also enabled the PSC to prescribe standards of competence to measure merit.
- 1995 - A restraint-focused federal budget led to further reductions in the size of the civil service.
- Late 1990s and early 2000s - There was rapid growth of the public service.
- 2003 - A new Public Service Employment Act was enacted, which created the first legislative definition of merit (it also redefined merit).

== Chairpersons and Presidents ==
- Marie Chantal Girard (2024-)
- Stan Lee (Acting, 2022)
- Patrick Borbey (2017–2022)
- Gerry Thom (acting, 2017)
- Christine Donoghue (acting, 2015–2017)
- Anne-Marie Robinson (2012–2016)
- Maria Barrados (2003–2012)
- Scott Serson (1999–2003)
- Ruth Hubbard (1994–1999)
- Robert J. Giroux (1990–1994)
- Huguette Labelle (1985–1990)
- Edgar Gallant (1976–1985)
- John Carson (1965–1976)
- Robertson MacNeill (1963–1965)
- Mr. Justice Samuel Hughes (1959–1963)
- Arnold Heeney (1957–1959)
- Stanley Nelson (1955–1957)
- Charles Bland (1935–1955)
- Hon. William Roche (1917–1935)
