= Castel C-36 =

Single-seat French glider, 1937

General information
- Type: Performance glider
- National origin: France
- Manufacturer: Castel
- Number built: 3

History
- First flight: 1937

The Castel C-36 was a performance glider built in the late 1930s in France. It was a glider of high-wing monoplane configuration.

== Specifications ==
Data from

General characteristics

- Crew: One
- Length: 6.45 m (21 ft 2 in)
- Wingspan: 14.59 m (47 ft 10 in)
- Height: 1.80 m (5 ft 11 in)
- Wing area: 14.41 m^{2} (155.1 sq ft)
- Aspect ratio: 22
- Empty weight: 120 kg (265 lb)
- Gross weight: 200 kg (441 lb)

Performance
