= Consumer Packaging and Labelling Act =

Canadian regulatory consumer protection statute

Parliament of Canada
- Long title: An Act respecting the packaging, labelling, sale, importation and advertising of prepackaged and certain other products
- Citation: R.S.C., 1985, c. C-38
- Territorial extent: Canada
- Enacted: 1970
- Administered by: Competition Bureau (non‑food products); Canadian Food Inspection Agency (food products)

Related legislation
- Competition Act
- Status: Current legislation

The Consumer Packaging and Labelling Act (CPLA; French: Loi sur l’emballage et l’étiquetage des produits de consommation) is a Canadian regulatory consumer protection statute that governs the packaging, labelling, sale, importation, and advertising of prepackaged and certain other consumer products in Canada.

The administration and enforcement of the Act and associated regulations are the responsibility of the Competition Bureau for matters relating to non‑food products, and the Canadian Food Inspection Agency (CFIA) as it relates to food products.

The Act has seen many amendments since it was originally passed in 1970.

== Overview ==
The Consumer Packaging and Labelling Act requires that prepackaged consumer products bear accurate and meaningful labelling information to help consumers make informed purchasing decisions. It prohibits the making of false or misleading representations and sets out specifications for mandatory label information such as the product's name, net quantity, and dealer identity.

The Act allows designated inspectors to: enter any place at any reasonable time; examine prepackaged products, open packages, examine and make copies of documents or papers; and seize products, labelling, packaging or advertising material which do not conform with the Act and Regulations. Conviction of an offense under the Act may result in up to a year in prison and a $10,000 fine.

The regulations govern the consistency, completeness, and accuracy of the labelling and packaging of consumer goods. These regulations create a uniform method for the labelling and packaging of consumer goods to assist consumers in making informed choices in the marketplace.

The administration and enforcement of the Act and associated regulations are the responsibility of the Competition Bureau for matters relating to non‑food products, and the Canadian Food Inspection Agency (CFIA) as it relates to food products.

=== Exempt products ===
The CPLA broadly defines "product" to mean any article that is, or may be, the subject of trade or commerce, including both food and non-food items. Textiles, on the other hand, fall under the Textile Labelling Act, and precious metals fall under the Precious Metals Marking Act.

There are certain classes of items that are exempt from the CPLA, such as commercial-, industrial-, or institutional-use only products, among others. The following products are exempt from all requirements of the CPLA:

- drugs and medical devices (as defined in the Food and Drugs Act, section 2)
- any food (as defined in the Safe Food for Canadians Act, section 2); this does not include pet food.
- products intended only for commercial, industrial, or institutional use
- products intended only for export
- products sold only to a duty-free store
- prepackaged textile articles (as defined in the Textile Labelling and Advertising Regulations, section 21)
- replacement parts for consumer durables (e.g., cars, appliances), under the condition that these products are not displayed to consumers
- certain artists’ supplies: colours for painting, dyeing, or printing; ceramic and enamel colours and glazes; surfaces and tools

The requirements under sections 4, 5, 6, and 10 of the CPLA (which deal specifically with requirements regarding labels, advertising, packaging, and net quantity information) do not apply to any prepackaged products that fall under the labelling requirements of any of the following:

- Feeds Act
- Fertilizers Act
- Seeds Act
- Pest Control Products Act

== History ==
The Consumer Packaging and Labelling Act was originally passed in 1970.

It has undergone several major revisions throughout its time: on December 31, 2002, on November 29, 2011, and on February 26, 2015.

=== Cases ===
In 2016, two executives of Mucci International Marketing Inc. and Mucci Pac Ltd. and their companies were levied fines by the Canadian Food Inspection Agency tribunal that totalled $1.5 million. Their offense was fraudulently putting "Product of Canada" labels on large quantities of peppers, tomatoes, and cucumbers grown mainly in Mexico. The defendants supplied the mislabelled produce to Costco, Loblaws, and Sobeys. The fraudulent labelling was discovered in 2012 at the Ontario Food Terminal, and investigators later executed three search warrants in 2013 and 2014, which resulted in the seizure of more than 70 boxes of documents. A court in Windsor, Ontario, heard the case. The agreed statement of facts quoted an email of a Mucci worker, where he was told "to make it Canada even though it is Mexico." The company, which was located in Kingsville, Ontario, at the time, was also sentenced to probation for a three-year term.

In November 2017, a tomato processing company in Maidstone, Ontario—which had received a controversial $3-million provincial grant—was convicted of fraudulently mislabelling products as organic under the CPLA as well as other legislation. The company and its owner were also charged with falsifying the country of origin on their products between September 2013 and July 2015, using labels that read "Product of Canada" for produce that was American in origin. The owner was charged with lying to a federal food inspector on 8 January 2015. The case was heard in the Ontario Court of Justice. Separately, the company went bankrupt, owing more than a hundred creditors a total of over $25 million.

On 12 March 2018, AMCO Produce, a greenhouse grower in Leamington, Ontario—along with its directors Fausto Amicone and Mark Wehby—answered to charges brought by the CFIA for origin-of-vegetable fraud in a Windsor court. The corporation pleaded guilty to three charges under the Food and Drugs Act, the CPLA, and the Canada Agricultural Products Act, and was fined $210,000. The individuals were let off in exchange for the guilty plea. The sentence included "intrusive" probation for a period of time under which the CFIA gains "unfettered" access to company records. The case began in February 2013 when the CFIA conducted a random inspection at the Ontario Food Terminal. Greenhouse peppers had been fraudulently mislabelled as Ontario produce at a time of year that was too cold for greenhouses to operate. The case covered offenses that occurred over a two-year span of time.
