= Civil Service Act, 1918 =

Act of the Parliament of Canada

Parliament of Canada
- Royal assent: 1918
- Repealed: 1967

Amended by
- Civil Service Act, 1938; Civil Service Act, 1961

Repealed by
- Public Service Employment Act; Public Service Staff Relations Act
- Status: Repealed

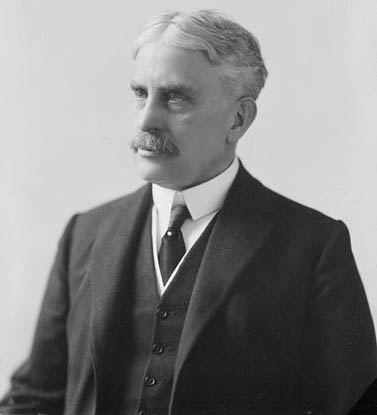
Former Canadian Prime Minister Robert Borden

The Civil Service Act, 1918 was an Act of the Parliament of Canada that following the First World War. The Act initiated a number of reforms to be made to the Civil Service of Canada and had implications on how Canadian public administration unfolded over the following decades.

The Act was amended in 1938 and 1961. In 1967, the Act was replaced by the Public Service Employment Act 1967 and Public Service Staff Relations Act. The two Acts were amended by the Public Service Reform Act 1992. The Public Service Employment Act 1967 was itself replaced by the Public Service Employment Act 2003.

== Background ==
In 1911, a number of members of the Ontario business community made a proposal to the then leader of the opposition, Robert Borden. In the proposal, they agreed to support Borden in the upcoming election if he instituted reforms in the civil service.

Those who lobbied for the reforms made the argument that until then the Civil Service of Canada had been inefficient largely as a result of patronage. Under a patronage system, the civil service had a tendency to go through a larger turnover than otherwise, as it is largely replaced following the formation of every new government. The direct result of this is a more limited expertise on the part of those occupying important government positions, decreasing productivity and efficiency in government.

More specifically, it was argued that this inefficient organization of the civil service reduced the international comparative advantage of Canada, having negative implications on the financial interests of Canadian businesses. They saw a more professional and skilled civil service as being conducive with these interests.

== The Act ==
A cornerstone of the Act was to shift away from these patronage-based appointments towards merit-based appointments to the civil service. Specifically, the Act called for a Civil Service Commission, which was later renamed the Public Service Commission of Canada, to oversee all appointments to the public service, as means of detaching the politicians from the appointment process.

Competitive exams were introduced with the commission to ensure competency among the service. In addition, much of the civil service was reorganized, and the job-classification system was overhauled.

== Effects ==
The Act led to a more professional, competent and skilled Canadian civil service. Moreover, the decreased turn-over associated with merit-based civil service results in a bureaucracy with interests more aligned with national, as opposed to partisan-political, well-being.

== See also ==
- List of acts of the Parliament of Canada
