= Canada Agricultural Products Act =

Canadian law regulating agricultural commerce

Parliament of Canada
- Long title: An Act to regulate the marketing of agricultural products in import, export and interprovincial trade and to provide for national standards and grades of agricultural products, for their inspection and grading, for the registration of establishments and for standards governing establishments
- Citation: R.S.C., 1985, c. 20 (4th Supp.)
- Royal assent: 7 July, 1988

Repeals
- Canada Agricultural Products Standards Act

The Canada Agricultural Products Act (CAPA; French: Loi sur les produits agricoles au Canada) is an Act of the Parliament of Canada. It institutes the Board of Arbitration and the Review Tribunal, the decisions of which are cognizable by the Federal Court of Canada. Registered Establishments and Accredited Laboratories are under its purview, as are national trademarks and trade in agricultural products. It also enables the Inspectorate to search and to seize agricultural products.

The CAPA enables the so-called Livestock and Poultry Carcass Grading Regulations, a voluntary programme established for the better communication between retailers and consumers.

== History ==
The Canada Agricultural Products Act, passed in 1988, replaced the Canada Agricultural Products Standards Act, originally passed in 1955 and amended in 1970.

Now governed by the Canadian Beef Grading Agency (CBGA), the Canadian grading system began in 1929. Grade standards and regulations are now enforced by Canadian Food Inspection Agency (CFIA) employees. Significant changes were introduced to the grading system in 1992, 1996 and 2001. The information collected through the grading process is used in making marketing and production decisions. Producers receive premiums for carcasses with a high grade. In 2016, the General Manager of the CBGA maintained that virtually all fed beef carcasses processed commercially in Canada were graded.

As of November 2016, there were 30 crops, of which apples and potatoes were two, that came under the purview of the CAPA legislation. As of November 2016, The maximum fine for an indictable offence under the Act was CA$250,000.

== Enforcement ==
In 2016, two executives of Mucci International Marketing Inc. and Mucci Pac Ltd. and their companies were levied fines by the CFIA tribunal that totalled CA$1.5 million. Their offence was fraudulently to put "Product of Canada" labels on large quantities of peppers, tomatoes and cucumbers grown mainly in Mexico. The defendants supplied the mislabelled produce to Costco, to Loblaws and to Sobeys. The fraud at the Ontario Food Terminal was discovered in 2012, and investigators later executed in 2013 and 2014 three search warrants, which resulted in the seizure of more than 70 boxes of documents. A court in Windsor, Ontario heard the case. The agreed statement of facts quoted an email of a Mucci worker, that he was told "to make it Canada even though it is Mexico."

In November 2017, a Maidstone, Ontario tomato processing company, that in addition had received a controversial $3-million provincial grant, was convicted of fraudulently mislabelling products as organic under the CAPA as well as other legislation. The owner and the company were also charged with falsifying the country of origin on their products between September 2013 and July 2015, passing off with labels that read "Product of Canada" produce that was American in origin. The owner was charged with lying to a federal food inspector on 8 January 2015. The case was heard in the Ontario Court of Justice. Separately, the company went bankrupt, owing more than a hundred creditors a total of over $25 million.

On 12 March 2018, a Leamington, Ontario greenhouse grower named AMCO Produce and its directors Fausto Amicone and Mark Wehby answered to charges brought by the CFIA for origin-of-vegetable fraud in a Windsor court. The corporation pleaded guilty to three charges under the Food and Drugs Act, the Consumer Packaging and Labeling Act and the CAPA, and was fined $210,000. The individuals were let off in exchange for the guilty plea. The sentence included "intrusive" probation for a period of time under which the CFIA gains "unfettered" access to company records. The case began when the CFIA did in February 2013 a random inspection at the Ontario Food Terminal. Greenhouse peppers had been fraudulently mislabelled as Ontario produce at a time of year that was too cold for greenhouses to operate. The case covered offences that occurred over a two-year span of time.
