= Caspar C 36 =

1920s German aircraft

C 36

General information
- Type: Reconnaissance aircraft
- Manufacturer: Caspar-Werke
- Designer: Reinhold Mewes
- Number built: 1

History
- First flight: 1928

The Caspar C 36 was an aircraft developed in Germany for aerial reconnaissance in the late 1920s.

== Design and development ==
The C 36 was a single-bay biplane with staggered, equal-span wings and a 660 hp (490 kW) BMW VI engine. The C 36 was tested in landplane and seaplane forms, but failed to win orders; the sole C 36 (civil registration D-1316) was given to RDL Erprobungsstelle in June 1929, before being decommissioned in early 1932.

== Variants ==
C 36
landplane form with conventional tailskid undercarriage.
C 36W
floatplane form with two large strut mounted floats.

== Specifications (C 36W) ==
Data from

General characteristics

- Crew: 2
- Length: 11.56 m (37 ft 11 in)
- Wingspan: 14.00 m (45 ft 11 in)
- Height: 4.43 m (14 ft 6 in)
- Wing area: 49.50 m^{2} (532.8 sq ft)
- Empty weight: 2,264 kg (4,991 lb)
- Gross weight: 3,000 kg (6,614 lb)
- Fuel capacity: 880 L (230 US gal; 190 imp gal) fuel; 55 L (15 US gal; 12 imp gal) oil, (481 kg (1,060 lb) fuel and oil)
- Powerplant: 1 × BMW VI 6.0Z 6-cylinder water-cooled in-line piston engine, 490 kW (660 hp) (6.0Z - compression ratio 6.0:1 and Zenith carburettor)
- Propellers: 2-bladed fixed-pitch propeller, 3.92 m (12 ft 10 in) diameter 2.76 m (9 ft 1 in) pitch

Performance

- Maximum speed: 255 km/h (158 mph, 138 kn)
- Cruise speed: 225 km/h (140 mph, 121 kn)
- Range: 1,050 km (650 mi, 570 nmi)
- Service ceiling: 5,360 m (17,590 ft)
