= Pest Control Products Act =

Act of Canadian Parliament

Parliament of Canada
- Long title: An Act to protect human health and safety and the environment by regulating products used for the control of pests
- Citation: S.C. 2002, c. 28
- Considered by: House of Commons of Canada
- Considered by: Senate of Canada
- Royal assent: December 12, 2002

Legislative history

First chamber: House of Commons of Canada
- Introduced by: Anne McLellan Minister of Health MP
- First reading: October 9, 2002
- Second reading: October 9, 2002
- Third reading: October 9, 2002

Second chamber: Senate of Canada
- Member(s) in charge: Yves Morin
- First reading: October 23, 2002
- Second reading: October 23, 2002
- Third reading: December 12, 2002
- Status: Current legislation

The Pest Control Products Act (French: Loi sur les produits antiparasitaires) is a Canadian legislation to govern the application of pesticides.

== History ==
A version that was in place from at least 1985 of the legislation, which was largely limited to praxis, combined with the approval features of the Canada Agricultural Products Act to govern the sphere.

The most recent legislation under this name was proclaimed in 2002 but did not came into force until June 28, 2006. along with its Regulations. The Pest Management Regulatory Agency, which was created under a former piece of legislation, reports to Parliament through Health Canada, and is delegated to govern the products.

On 31 January 2008, the Review Panel Regulations were instituted, in order to administer sections 35 to 40 of the Act.

A statutory review of the Pest Control Products Act was held by the Health Committee of Parliament on 27 January 2015. Three witnesses from the Pest Management Regulatory Agency, Richard Aucoin, Jason Flint and Connie Moase, were called to speak on the legislation. Aucoin, the Executive Director of the PMRA, stressed the science-based and OECD-collaborative nature of the review process.

Along with others, the Act was amended in 2016 in order to implement the Agreement on Trade Facilitation, which was done at Geneva by members of the World Trade Organization on 27 November 2014, as an amendment to Annex 1A of the Marrakesh Agreement establishing the World Trade Organization.
