= Respite (law) =

A respite is a delay in the imposition of sentence but in no way modifies a sentence or addresses questions of due process, guilt or innocence.

== United States ==
The pardon power of the United States Constitution has been broadly interpreted to include a variety of specific powers. Among those powers are: pardons, conditional pardons, commutations of sentence, conditional commutations of sentence, remissions of fines and forfeitures, respites and amnesties.

Historically, presidents have granted most respites for periods of 30 to 90 days and have renewed (extended) such delays when it seemed necessary. The most common public explanations for respites have been to:

- delay executions (for a variety of reasons)
- allow additional time to study clemency applications
- await the outcome of an appeal
- allow full executive review of a sentence affirmed in the appellate process

While these have been the commonly stated reasons, the Constitution does not limit the circumstances or the length of time involved

According to the Office of the Pardon Attorney (U.S. Department of Justice), presidents have utilized respites to varying degrees although, as is the case with every other form of executive clemency, there has been something like a general decline since 1900. The Pardon Attorney has posted data for respites for some administrations. Most recently, Bill Clinton delayed the execution of Juan Garza in order that an ongoing study of bias in the federal death-penalty system might be completed.
