= Tax Court of Canada Act =

1983 Canadian legislation

The Tax Court of Canada Act (French: Loi sur la Cour canadienne de l’impôt) was a 1983 Act of the Parliament of Canada concerning the Tax Court of Canada.
