= 1917 Canadian federal election =

- December 17, 1917

235 seats in the House of Commons 118 seats needed for a majority
- Turnout: 75.0% (▲4.8 pp)
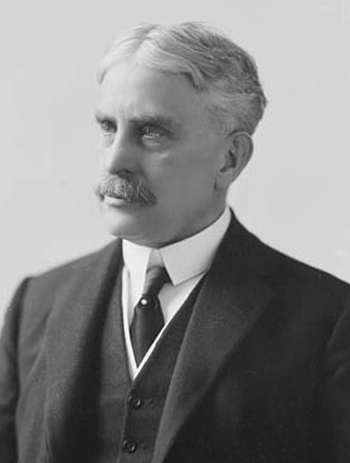

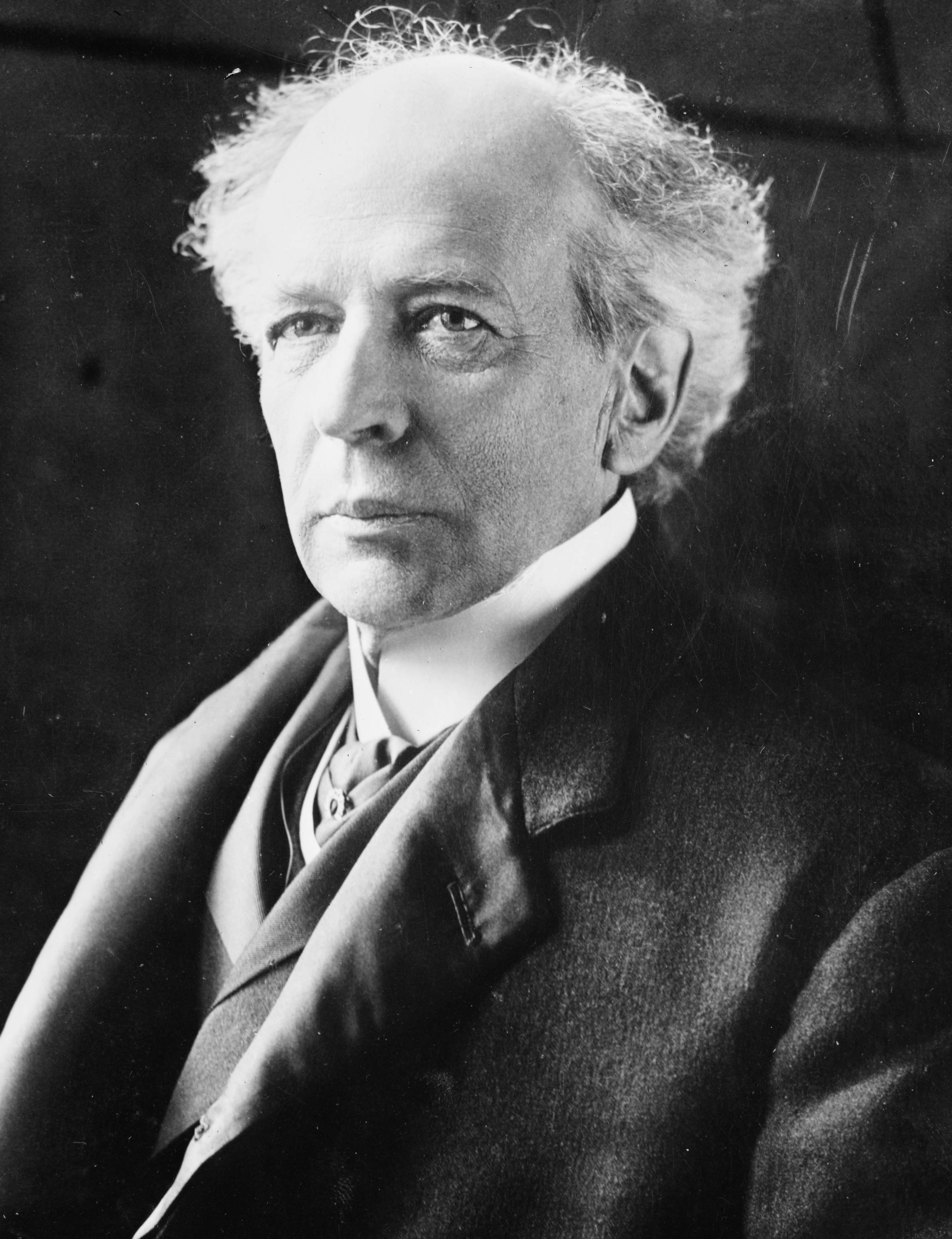
	First party	Second party
Leader	Robert Borden	Wilfrid Laurier
Party	Government (Unionist)	Opposition (Laurier Liberals)
Leader since	February 6, 1901; Unionist: October 10, 1917	June 2, 1887; Laurier Liberals: 1917
Leader's seat	Kings	Quebec East (Note: Laurier also ran in Ottawa (City of), where he was defeated.)
Last election	132 seats, 48.56% (Note: seats won by the Conservative Party.)	85 seats, 45.82% (Note: seats won by the Liberal Party.)
Seats won	153	82
Seat change	▲21	▼3
Popular vote	1,070,694	729,756
Percentage	56.93%	38.80%
Swing	▲8.38 pp	▼7.02 pp

- The Canadian parliament after the 1917 election
Prime Minister before election
Robert Borden
Government (Unionist)
Prime Minister after election
Robert Borden
Government (Unionist)

The 1917 Canadian federal election was held on December 17, 1917, to elect members of the House of Commons of Canada of the 13th Parliament of Canada. Described by historian Michael Bliss as the "most bitter election in Canadian history", it was fought mainly over the issue of conscription (see Conscription Crisis of 1917). The election resulted in Prime Minister Sir Robert Borden's Unionist government elected with a strong majority and the largest percentage of the popular vote for any party in Canadian history. This election is known as a "khaki election" as it was held on a period of wartime sentiment.

The previous election of 1911 was won by Borden's Conservatives. Normally, there is a constitutional requirement that Parliament last no longer than five years, which would have resulted in an election in 1916. However, citing the wartime emergency, the Parliament of Canada approved a one-year extension, which was implemented by the British Parliament. The Borden government hoped that the delay would allow the formation of a "grand coalition" government, encompassing all the parties, such as existed in Britain.

Sir Wilfrid Laurier, head of the Liberal Party of Canada, refused to join the coalition over the issue of conscription, which was strongly opposed in the French heartland of Quebec. Laurier worried that agreeing to Borden's coalition offer would cause that province to abandon the Liberals and perhaps even Canada. Borden proceeded to form a "Unionist" government, and the Liberal Party split over the issue. Many English Canadian Liberal MPs and provincial Liberal parties in English Canada supported the new Unionist government.

To ensure victory for conscription, Borden introduced two laws to skew the voting towards the government. The first, the Wartime Elections Act, disenfranchised conscientious objectors and Canadian citizens if they were born in enemy countries and had arrived after 1902. The law also gave wives and female relatives of servicemen the vote. Thus, the 1917 election was the first federal election in which some women were allowed to vote. The other new law was the Military Voters Act, which allowed soldiers serving abroad to choose which riding their vote would be counted in or to allow the party for which they voted to select the riding in which the vote would be counted. That allowed government officials to guide the strongly pro-conscription soldiers into voting in those ridings where they would be more useful. Servicemen were given a ballot with the simple choice of "Government" or "Opposition". It is calculated that the Unionist government took 14 seats from the Opposition due to its use of Army votes.

Soon after these measures were passed, Borden convinced a faction of Liberals (using the name Liberal-Unionists) along with Gideon Decker Robertson, who was described as a "Labour" Senator (but was unaffiliated with any Labour Party) to join with them, forming the Unionist government in October 1917. He then dissolved parliament to seek a mandate in the election, which pitted "Government" candidates, running as the Unionist Party, against the anti-conscription faction of the Liberal Party, which ran under the name Laurier Liberals. As well, Independent, Labour and Socialist candidates ran in many ridings across the country.

The divisive debate ended with the country divided on linguistic lines. The Liberals won 82 seats, 62 in Quebec, with many other seats won in provinces such as Manitoba, New Brunswick, and Ontario in ridings with significant French Canadian populations. The Unionists won 153 seats. The three Unionist won seats in Quebec were all in mainly English-speaking ridings. That led to the Francœur Motion in January 1918.

Out of 235 seats, 33 were won by acclamation—17 to the Laurier Liberals (all in Quebec) and 16 to the Unionists (all outside Quebec). Two of the Unionist acclamations were for the riding of Halifax, where the only candidates were two Unionists, and where, eleven days earlier, the tragic Halifax Explosion had taken place.

The election was conducted mostly using First past the post in single-member ridings but Ottawa, Queens, and Halifax each had two members and each of the voters there cast up to two votes as per Plurality block voting.

== National results ==

Party	Party leader	# of candidates	Seats			Popular vote		
Party	Party leader	# of candidates	1911	Elected	% Change	#	%	pp Change
Government (Unionist)^{1}	Robert Borden	211	132	153	+15.9%	1,070,694	56.93%	+8.38
Opposition (Laurier Liberals)^{1}	Wilfrid Laurier	213	85	82	-3.5%	729,756	38.80%	-7.02
Labour		22	1	-	-100%	34,558	1.84%	+0.91
Opposition-Labour		8	*	-	*	22,251	1.03%	*
Independent		5	-	-	-	12,023	0.64%	-0.15
Independent Liberal		2	*	-	*	7,753	0.41%	-
Unknown		12	-	-	-	3,773	0.20%	-1.78
Nonpartisan League		3	*	-	*	2,863	0.15%	-
Total		476	221	235	+5.9%	1,880,702	100%	
Sources: http://www.elections.ca -- History of Federal Ridings since 1867

Notes:

* Party did not nominate candidates in the previous election.

^{1} % change for Government compared to Conservative Party (including Liberal-Conservatives) in 1911 election, and for Opposition to Liberal Party.

== Results by province ==
Party name		BC	AB	SK	MB	ON	QC	NB	NS	PE	YK	Total
Government	Seats:	13	11	16	14	74	3	7	12	2	1	153
Government	Popular Vote (%):	68.4	61.0	74.1	79.7	62.3	24.7	59.4	48.4	49.8	54.3	56.9
Opposition	Seats:	-	1	-	1	8	62	4	4	2	-	82
Opposition	Vote (%):	25.6	30.6	23.4	20.3	32.1	73.4	40.6	45.5	50.2	45.7	38.8
Total seats		13	12	16	15	82	65	11	16	4	1	235
Parties that won no seats:
Labour	Vote (%):	5.6	0.8			2.3	0.3		6.1			1.8
Opposition-Labour	Vote (%):		5.0	2.6		1.2						1.0
Independent	Vote (%):		0.5			1.2	0.5					0.6
Independent Liberal	Vote (%):					0.8	0.5					0.4
Unknown	Vote (%):	0.4				0.1	0.7					0.2
Non-Partisan	Vote (%):		2.2									0.2

== See also ==
- List of Canadian federal general elections
- List of political parties in Canada
- 11th Canadian Parliament
- 13th Canadian Parliament
- Conscription crisis of 1917
- Khaki election
