= Tobacco and Vaping Products Act =

1997 Canadian legislation

Parliament of Canada
- Long title: An Act to regulate the manufacture, sale, labelling and promotion of tobacco products and vaping products
- Citation: S.C. 1997, c. 13
- Royal assent: 25 April 1997
- Status: Current legislation

The Tobacco and Vaping Products Act (French: Loi sur le tabac et les produits de vapotage) is a Canadian law to regulate the production, marketing and sale of tobacco and vaping products. The law replaced the Tobacco Act, Bill C-71 during the 35th Canadian Parliament in 1997, which itself replaced the former Tobacco Sales To Young Persons Act of 1994 as well as the Tobacco Products Control Act of 1989. The Tobacco Act was amended on July 5, 2010 and renamed to Tobacco and Vaping Products Act in 2018 when similar laws concerning vaping products were added.

== Purpose ==
The purpose of the Act is to protect the health of Canadians by imposing limits on the sale and production of tobacco products. It increases awareness of the health risks associated with use of tobacco products. The Act also protects young people by restricting the age of purchase.

== Regulations made under the Act ==
=== Tobacco (Access) Regulations ===
The legal age to purchase tobacco products varies with each province. A person may be asked for documentation to verify their age before purchasing a tobacco product. Under the Act, suitable forms of identification include a driver's license, passport, Canadian permanent resident document, certificate of Canadian citizenship with signature, or a Canadian Armed Forces identification card. Forms of identification issued by a provincial, federal, or foreign government with a signature, photo, and date of birth are also accepted. In addition, every retailer must place a sign near the tobacco products. The sign must adhere to the specifications outlined in the Tobacco Act. It must be in a visible location with a surface area no smaller than 600 cm^{2} with the following text:

"It is prohibited by federal law to provide tobacco products to persons under 18 years of age. Il est interdit par la loi fédérale de fournir des produits du tabac aux personnes âgées de moins de 18 ans.”

=== Tobacco products labelling regulations (cigarettes and little cigars) ===
Tobacco products must have legible packaging with text in both of Canada's official languages, English and French. The package must contain health warnings and information on toxic emissions, either in the form of text or pictures and text. They must be displayed on equal opposite sides of the packaging, on the largest visible side, and on the lid. The warnings may also be included on a leaflet that is visible when accessing the product.

=== Promotion of tobacco products and accessories regulations (prohibited terms) ===
The Act prohibits the promotion and advertising of tobacco products when the terms "light" or "mild" are used. This applies to products, packaging, and accessories associated with tobacco. A retailer also cannot display these products if "light" and "mild" are on the packaging.

=== Cigarette ignition propensity regulations ===
The Act requires that every brand of cigarettes manufactured on or after October 1, 2005, be tested by manufacturers to make sure the cigarette burns up completely less than 25% of the time. The test is to be conducted using 10 layers of filter paper and each cigarette tested must be of the same brand.
