= Military Voters Act =

1917 Canadian act that expanded suffrage to all soldiers

Parliament of Canada
- Citation: SC 1917 (7 & 8 Geo V), c 34
- Enacted by: House of Commons of Canada
- Enacted: September 14, 1917
- Considered by: Senate of Canada
- Assented to: September 20, 1917

Legislative history

First chamber: House of Commons of Canada
- Bill title: 127
- Introduced by: Charles Doherty
- First reading: August 13, 1917
- Second reading: August 20, 1917
- Third reading: August 29–31, 1917

Second chamber: Senate of Canada
- Bill title: 127
- Member(s) in charge: James Alexander Lougheed
- First reading: September 3, 1917
- Second reading: September 7–11, 1917
- Third reading: September 14, 1917

Amends
- Dominion Elections Act; RSC 1906, c 6

Repealed by
- Dominion Elections Act; SC 1920 (10 & 11 Geo V), c 46

Related legislation
- Wartime Elections Act
- Status: Repealed

The Military Voters Act (French: Loi des électeurs militaires) was a 1917 act of the Parliament of Canada. The legislation was passed in 1917 during World War I, giving the right to vote to all Canadian soldiers. The act was significant for swinging the newly enlarged military vote in the Unionist Party's favour, and in that it gave a large number of Canadian women the right to vote for the first time.

== Background ==
With the Conscription Crisis of 1917 in full swing, Prime Minister Robert Borden was anxious to produce a solution to the manpower problem that Canada had been experiencing as the war drew on. With the main opposition to conscription coming from his French-speaking ministers, the Prime Minister favoured the creation of a coalition government of Conservatives and Liberals. It was believed that this was the best means to introduce mandatory service in the military. Although Sir Wilfrid Laurier, the Liberal party leader, understood the need for a coalition government in order to withstand the war, he was opposed to the implementation of conscription. Prime Minister Borden, however, was able to convince several key Liberal members to join his Union government. It was prior to the dissolution of Parliament that two bills were created to increase Borden’s chances of getting the coalition government elected. The bills were the Wartime Elections Act and the Military Voters Act.

== Voting under the act ==
The Military Voters Act was introduced in August 1917 and gave the vote to all Canadian sailors and soldiers regardless of their period of residence in the country. Notably, this even included status Indians in the military, a provision which made the 1917 election the only federal election prior to 1960 in which any status Indians could vote.

The other unique provision of the act was that a military voter was not to cast his ballot for a specific candidate, which was standard procedure for general elections. Instead, military ballots gave soldiers the simple choice of "Government" or "Opposition." If the constituency in which the voter had lived at the time of enlistment was specified, it was there that the ballot would be counted. Without a specific constituency, the vote would be assigned to a riding by the party for which the vote was cast. Since the overwhelming majority of votes were cast, as expected, for the "Government" this ability to assign votes allowed the incumbent government to use the votes in those constituencies where it was most beneficial to their party.

It is calculated that the Unionist government took 14 seats from the Opposition due to its use of military votes.

== Connection with the feminist movement ==
The women's suffrage movement also benefited from the Military Voters Act. The act awarded the vote to women serving in the armed forces as well as nurses in the war. As women in Canada had previously been completely disenfranchised, this law paved the way for future legislation expanding women's voting rights, such as the 1918 federal Women's Franchise Act granting access to the ballot to all female British subjects aged 21 or older. As most people born in Canada were British subjects at the time, this law applied to most Canadian women who were not status Indians or members of a racial minority (these groups would be separately enfranchised in later acts).

== Political implications ==
Prime Minister Borden created the Military Voters Act coupled with the Wartime Elections Act with the intent of strengthening the coalition government's chances at the polls. During election campaigning, the newly formed Unionist government fought with the Liberal opposition largely on cultural lines. The conscription issue dominated election tactics along with the aggressive opposition to conscription from Quebec and the French-speaking Canadians. The result of the 1917 federal election saw the Unionist coalition government led by Borden receiving two-thirds of the constituencies outside Quebec, but only three seats within Quebec. Ninety percent of the soldiers' vote went to the Unionist government. The Military Voters Act served the purpose for which it was created, to solidify the election of the Unionist government.

== Works cited ==
- Francis, R. Douglas (2004). Destinies: Canadian History Since Confederation (5th ed.). Scarborough: Nelson. ISBN 9780176224356.
- Morton, Desmond (2001). A Short History of Canada. Toronto: McClellan and Stewart. ISBN 9780771065095.
- Granatstein, J. L.; Hitsman, J. Mackay (1977). Broken Promises: A History of Conscription in Canada. Toronto: Oxford University Press. ISBN 9780195402582.
