= Canada Consumer Product Safety Act =

Canadian legislation

Parliament of Canada
- Long title: An Act respecting the safety of consumer products
- Citation: S.C. 2010, c. 21
- Considered by: House of Commons of Canada
- Considered by: Senate of Canada

Legislative history

First chamber: House of Commons of Canada
- Introduced by: Leona Aglukkaq MP, Minister of Health
- First reading: June 9, 2010
- Second reading: October 7, 2010
- Third reading: October 29, 2010

Second chamber: Senate of Canada
- Member(s) in charge: Yonah Martin
- First reading: November 2, 2010
- Second reading: November 18, 2010
- Third reading: December 13, 2010
- Status: Current legislation

The Canada Consumer Product Safety Act (French: Loi canadienne sur la sécurité des produits de consommation) is an Act of the Parliament of Canada that passed into law on December 14, 2010. This law replaced Part I of the Hazardous Products Act. It was originally introduced in the 2nd session of the 39th Parliament of Canada as Bill C-52. It died in committee when the 2008 Canadian federal election was called, but was reintroduced in the second session of the 40th Parliament of Canada as Bill C-6 and was passed by both houses of Parliament but did not receive royal assent before Parliament was prorogued. It was introduced for a third time in the third session of the 40th Parliament as Bill C-36.

The legislative package amended the Hazardous Products Act (HPA) to regulate consumer products under the Canada Consumer Product Safety Act. These bills are a result of increased consumer concern over consumer products, such as children's toys, which have been the subject of recalls over the past few years. Canada's Hazardous Products Act had not been updated in over 40 years. Canada's regulatory system has not kept pace with the global economy and increasing amounts of international trade. The Minister of Health, for example, currently doesn't have the power to force the recall of faulty or counterfeit products in Canada.

== Support for improving Consumer Product Safety ==
Health Canada consulted widely with industry and consumer groups over a period of several years before bringing forward the Consumer Product Safety Action Plan.

Health Canada regularly issues warnings, advisories and information updates to advise consumers of products on the market which contain toxic substances such as lead, mercury or arsenic; or are otherwise contaminated by dangerous and unhealthy substances. However under the previous legislation, the Minister of Health has no power to compel recall of these products. For example, Health Canada posted just over 300 recall notices in 2009. Roughly one third of these were for children's products. In 2009, about 1.5 million consumers were affected by crib recalls alone.
