= Safe Streets and Communities Act =

Act of the Parliament of Canada

Parliament of Canada
- Long title: An Act to enact the Justice for Victims of Terrorism Act and to amend the State Immunity Act, the Criminal Code, the Controlled Drugs and Substances Act, the Corrections and Conditional Release Act, the Youth Criminal Justice Act, the Immigration and Refugee Protection Act and other Acts
- Citation: Bill C-10
- Considered by: House of Commons of Canada
- Considered by: Senate of Canada
- Royal assent: March 13, 2012

Legislative history

Initiating chamber: House of Commons of Canada
- Bill title: Bill C-10
- Introduced by: MP Rob Nicholson
- First reading: September 20, 2011
- Second reading: September 28, 2011
- Third reading: December 5, 2011

Revising chamber: Senate of Canada
- Bill title: Bill C-10
- First reading: December 6, 2011
- Second reading: December 16, 2011
- Third reading: March 1, 2012
- Conference committee bill passed by House of Commons of Canada: November 24, 2011
- Conference committee bill passed by Senate of Canada: February 28, 2012
- Status: Current legislation

The Safe Streets and Communities Act (French: Loi sur la sécurité des rues et des communautés) is an act passed by the 41st Canadian Parliament 154–129 on March 12, 2012.

When Parliament re-convened in September 2011, the Minister of Justice introduced the Safe Streets and Communities Act, an omnibus bill of nine separate measures. The measures include replacing the pardon system with 'record suspensions', mandatory minimum sentences for certain sexual offences and mandatory minimum penalties for certain drug offences, making it illegal to make sexually explicit information available to a child, increasing prison sentences for marijuana offences, reducing the ability of judges to sentence certain offenders to house arrest, allowing immigration officers to deny work permits to foreigners who are at risk of being sexually exploited, and enabling Canadians to sue state sponsors of terrorism for losses due to an act of terrorism.

A particularly contentious aspect of the bill was the proposed enhancement of powers given to government authorities to monitor online communications, but this proposal was abandoned after an online petition opposing those measures garnered over 70,000 signatures.

One of the smaller bills incorporated into this legislation was Bill C-23B, formerly called "Eliminating Pardons for Serious Offences." This section made significant changes to the country's pardon laws. Part 3 of the bill replaced the term "pardon" with "Record Suspension" and eliminated pardons for those with Schedule 1 criminal offences on their record or those with more than three offences each carrying a sentence of two years or more.

The bill caused much controversy. While the Canadian Police Association said the bill would work towards keeping communities more safe, it added it was concerned about the cost. The Quebec government said it would refuse to pay for the bill, calling it a short-term "Band-Aid solution." The Ontario government would also refuse to pay. Texan conservatives Judge John Creuzot, Republican Representative Jerry Madden, and Marc Levin also spoke out against the bill; according to Madden, "It's a very expensive thing to build new prisons and, if you build them, I guarantee you they will come. They'll be filled, OK? Because people will send them there."
