= Canadian Beef Grading Agency =

The Canadian Beef Grading Agency (French: Agence canadienne de classement du boeuf) is an organization accredited by the Canadian Food Inspection Agency to monitor grading of meat products in Canada.
