= International Transfer of Offenders Act =

Canadian law regarding prisoner transfers

Parliament of Canada
- Long title: An Act to implement treaties and administrative arrangements on the international transfer of persons found guilty of criminal offences
- Citation: S.C. 2004, c. 21
- Considered by: House of Commons of Canada
- Considered by: Senate of Canada
- Royal assent: May 14, 2004

Legislative history

First chamber: House of Commons of Canada
- Introduced by: Anne McLellan MP, Deputy Prime Minister and Minister of Public Safety and Emergency Preparedness
- First reading: February 12, 2004
- Second reading: February 12, 2004
- Third reading: April 27, 2004

Second chamber: Senate of Canada
- First reading: April 27, 2004
- Second reading: May 5, 2004
- Third reading: May 13, 2004
- Status: Current legislation

The International Transfer of Offenders Act (French: Loi sur le transfèrement international des délinquants) is Canadian federal legislation. Passed in 2004, it allows Canadians who had been convicted of a crime in another nation to apply to serve their sentence, or a portion thereof, in a Canadian prison. The Act gives the Minister of Public Safety the authority to approve or decline prisoners' applications for transfer.

The Act was passed shortly before Conservative Stephen Harper was elected Prime Minister of Canada in 2005. Legal journalists and legal scholars criticized the Harper government for arbitrarily declining to approve transfers without adequate reasons. According to The Globe and Mail on January 19, 2012, Justice Robert Barnes ruled that Vic Toews had failed to provide adequate reasons when he declined to approve the transfer of Richard Goulet. Barnes called decisions like this "pro forma" decisions, which were usually approved because it was in Canada's interest to know when felons were scheduled for release, and because it was in Canada's interest to enrol prisoners in the Canadian parole system, so their transition from prison could be monitored. Barnes's ruling noted twelve other cases where Toews and his predecessors had declined to approve prisoner transfers without supplying an adequate explanation.

In 2009, the Canadian Civil Liberties Association criticized amendments the Conservatives were proposing to the law—amendments that relaxed the obligations the Minister of Public Safety had to explain his or her decisions.
