= Criminal Records Act =

The Criminal Records Act (French: Loi sur le casier judiciaire) is a piece of Canadian legislation intended to provide for the relief of persons who have been convicted of offences and have subsequently rehabilitated themselves. It became law in 1970.

The purpose of the Act is to provide a means of criminal records suspension. According to the Act, a record suspension is evidence of the fact that the applicant was of good conduct, and that the conviction should no longer reflect adversely on the applicant's character. Following a successful application, the records in question are kept separate and apart from other criminal records, are removed from the automated criminal records retrieval system maintained by the Royal Canadian Mounted Police (RCMP), and are not disclosed to any person without the prior approval of the Minister.

Without a record suspension, Canadians can face problems securing employment, housing and volunteer positions.

== The Parole Board of Canada ==
The Act gives the Parole Board of Canada the exclusive jurisdiction and absolute discretion to grant, refuse or revoke a record suspension.

== Procedure ==
The Act sets out the procedure for granting a record suspension. Firstly, the applicant must satisfy a waiting period of 10 years in the case of indictable offences and five years in the case of summary offences.

The Act also provides relief for military service records.

Ineligible offences

Two types of records are ineligible under the Act:

- Schedule 1 offences against a minor
- More than three indictable convictions each carrying a prison sentence of more than two years

In the case of Schedule 1 offences, there is an exception if the person was less than five years older than the victim, was not in a position of trust or authority and no force or coercion was used. The onus is on the applicant to prove that this is the case.

Even if all the eligibility criteria are met, the Criminal Records Act gives the Parole Board the discretion to deny the record suspension if it would bring the "administration of justice into disrepute." To determine this, the Parole Board members may look at the nature and gravity of the offences, the circumstances and the criminal history of the applicant.

Proposal to Deny

If the Parole Board is considering denying the application, they will give the applicant an opportunity to make further submissions in writing or at an oral hearing. If the record suspension is denied, the applicant must wait one year before applying again.

Granted Record Suspension

Once the record suspension is granted, the criminal record is kept separate from active records and cannot be disclosed without permission of the Public Safety Minister.

== Absolute and Conditional Discharges ==
Under the Act, a record cannot be disclosed one year after receiving an absolute discharge or three years after receiving a conditional discharge.

== Vulnerable Persons ==
If a person applies for a job or volunteer position that involves working in a position of trust with people who are vulnerable due to age or disability, sexual offences may be disclosed even if a record suspension has been received.

== Disclosure ==
An employer cannot ask about a criminal record for which a Record Suspension has been received.

The Parole Board may release decisions, but they must not disclose identifying details without the individual's consent.

== Reporting ==
The Parole Board is required to make an annual report to Parliament about the number of Record Suspensions applications received, ordered and refused, how many suspensions were granted by the offence and any other information the Minister requests.

== Changes to the Criminal Records Act ==
In 2012, the Canadian government changed the name of pardons to record suspension. This reflects the fact that the pardon could be revoked if the person were to re-offend.

The Canadian government undertook public consultation on the Criminal Records Act in 2016. The results will be used to inform further changes to the Act.
