= Structure of the Canadian federal government =

Entities of the Canadian Federal State

The following list outlines the structure of the federal government of Canada, the collective set of federal institutions which can be grouped into the legislative, executive, and judicial branches. In turn, these are further divided into departments, agencies, and other organizations which support the day-to-day function of the Canadian state.

The list includes roughly 130 departments and other organizations, with nearly 300,000 employees, who collectively form the Public Service of Canada. Special Operating Agencies (which are departmental organizations), and non-departmental organizations such as Crown corporations, administrative tribunals, and oversight organizations are parts of the public service operating in areas seen as requiring a higher level of independence from it and the direct political control of ministers. Public servants are agents of the Crown and responsible to Parliament through their relevant minister.

This list is organized according to functional grouping and is further subdivided by category such as offices, departments, agencies, and Crown corporations:

== The Crown ==
=== Regal and vice-regal offices ===
- King of Canada
  - Canadian Secretary to the King
  - Governor General of Canada
    - Secretary to the Governor General of Canada
    - Canadian Heraldic Authority

=== King's Privy Council ===
- King's Privy Council for Canada
  - Cabinet of Canada
    - Treasury Board of Canada
      - Canada School of Public Service
      - Treasury Board of Canada Secretariat
  - Privy Council Office
    - Intergovernmental Affairs Secretariat
    - Office of the Leader of the Government in the House of Commons

== Executive ==
=== Public Service ===
==== Central agencies ====
Agency	Abbreviation	Established	Ministers	Deputy heads	Associated entities
Finance	FIN	1867	François-Philippe Champagne (Minister of Finance)	Nick Leswick (Deputy Minister)	Central bank: Bank of Canada; Intelligence agency: Financial Transactions and Reports Analysis Centre of Canada; Crown corporations: Canada Deposit Insurance Corporation; Canada Development Investment Corporation; Canadian Pension Plan Investment Board; Public Sector Pension Investment Board; Royal Canadian Mint; Non-profit organization: Payments Canada; Regulators: Financial Consumer Agency of Canada; Office of the Superintendent of Financial Institutions; Office of the Chief Actuary; Review body: Canadian International Trade Tribunal
Privy Council Office	PCO	1867	Mark Carney (Prime Minister) Dominic LeBlanc (Minister responsible for Canada-U.S. Trade, Intergovernmental Affairs and One Canadian Economy, Minister for Internal Trade, and President of the Privy Council) Steven MacKinnon (Leader of the Government in the House of Commons)	Michael Sabia (Clerk of the Privy Council)	Intergovernmental Affairs Secretariat; Office of the Leader of the Government in the House of Commons; Major Projects Office; Canada's Fight Against Fentanyl
Treasury Board of Canada Secretariat	TBS	1867	Shafqat Ali (President of the Treasury Board)	Bill Matthews (Secretary of the Treasury Board)	Canada School of Public Service

==== Ministerial departments ====
Department	Abbreviation	Established	Ministers	Deputy heads	Associated entities
Agriculture and Agri-Food	AAFC	1868	Heath MacDonald (Minister of Agriculture and Agri-Food)	Lawrence Hanson (Deputy Minister)	Agencies: Canadian Grain Commission; Cooperatives Secretariat; Farm Products Council of Canada; Special Operating Agency: Canadian Pari-Mutuel Agency; Crown corporations: Canadian Dairy Commission; Farm Credit Canada; Review Body: Canada Agricultural Review Tribunal
Canadian Heritage	PCH	1993	Marc Miller (Minister of Canadian Identity and Culture)	Francis Bilodeau (Deputy Minister)	Agencies: Library and Archives Canada; National Battlefields Commission; National Film Board of Canada; Sport Canada; Special Operating Agencies: Canadian Conservation Institute; Canadian Heritage Information Network; Crown corporations: Canadian Broadcasting Corporation; Canada Council for the Arts; Canadian Museum for Human Rights; Canadian Museum of History; Canadian Museum of Immigration at Pier 21; Canadian Museum of Nature; Canadian Race Relations Foundation; Ingenium; Canada Agriculture and Food Museum; Canada Aviation and Space Museum; Canada Science and Technology Museum; National Arts Centre; National Capital Commission; National Gallery of Canada; Telefilm Canada; Regulator: Canadian Radio-television and Telecommunications Commission; Review Body: Canadian Cultural Property Export Review Board
Crown-Indigenous Relations and Northern Affairs	CIRNAC	2019 1880 (historic)	Rebecca Alty (Minister of Crown–Indigenous Relations) Rebecca Chartrand (Minister of Northern and Arctic Affairs)	Valerie Gideon (Deputy Minister)	Agencies: Cree-Naskapi Commission; Nunavut Wildlife Management Board; Crown corporation: Corporation for the Mitigation of Mackenzie Gas Project Impacts; Departmental corporation: Polar Knowledge Canada
Employment and Social Development	ESDC	2003	Patty Hajdu (Minister of Jobs and Families)	Paul Thompson (Deputy Minister of Employment and Social Development) Rob Wright (Deputy Minister of Labour; Associate Deputy Minister of Employment and Social Development)	Agencies: Accessibility Standards Canada; Canada Employment Insurance Commission; Canadian Centre for Occupational Health and Safety; Federal Mediation and Conciliation Service; National Seniors Council; Service Canada; Social benefits administered; Canada Pension Plan; Employment Insurance; Old Age Security; Social insurance number; Service Canada Centres for Youth; Programs: Labour Program; Canada Student Loans Program; Canadian Digital Service; Joint Program: Seasonal Agricultural Workers Program; Crown Corporation: Canada Mortgage and Housing Corporation; Review Bodies: Canada Industrial Relations Board; Occupational Health and Safety Tribunal of Canada; Social Security Tribunal of Canada
Environment and Climate Change	ECCC	1971	Julie Dabrusin (Minister of the Environment, Climate Change and Nature)	Mollie Johnson (Deputy Minister)	Agencies: Impact Assessment Agency; Parks Canada; Historic Sites and Monuments Board of Canada; Canadian Wildlife Service; Meteorological Service of Canada; Weatheradio Canada; Canadian Ice Service; Water Survey of Canada; Canadian Hurricane Centre; Canadian Meteorological Centre; Storm Prediction Centres; Canada Water Agency; Enforcement Agency: Parks Canada Wardens; Environmental Enforcement; Wildlife Enforcement; Review body: Environmental Protection Tribunal of Canada
Fisheries and Oceans	DFO	1868	Joanne Thompson (Minister of Fisheries)	Paul MacKinnon (Deputy Minister)	Enforcement Agency: Fishery Officers; Special Operating Agency: Canadian Hydrographic Service; Crown Corporation: Freshwater Fish Marketing Corporation
Global Affairs	GAC	1909	Anita Anand (Minister of Foreign Affairs) Maninder Sidhu (Minister of International Trade)	Arun Thangaraj (Deputy Minister of Foreign Affairs) Glenn Purves (Deputy Minister of International Trade) Cynthia Termorshuizen (Deputy Minister of International Development)	Agencies: Invest in Canada; Trade Controls Bureau; Trade Commissioner Service; Asia Pacific Foundation of Canada; Crown corporations: Canadian Commercial Corporation; Export Development Canada; International Development Research Centre; Review body: Office of the Extractive Sector Corporate Social Responsibility Counsellor
Health	HC	1993 1919 (historic)	Marjorie Michel (Minister of Health)	Shalene Curtis-Micallef (Deputy Minister)	Agencies: Public Health Agency of Canada; National Microbiology Laboratory; Funding Agency: Canadian Institutes of Health Research; Regulator: Canadian Food Inspection Agency; National Centre for Foreign Animal Disease; Review Body: Patented Medicine Prices Review Board
Housing, Infrastructure and Communities	HICC	2002	Gregor Robertson (Minister of Housing and Infrastructure)	Paul Halucha (Deputy Minister)	Agencies: Build Canada Homes; Crown corporations: Canada Infrastructure Bank; Jacques Cartier Bridges Incorporated; Waterfront Toronto; Windsor-Detroit Bridge Authority
Immigration, Refugees and Citizenship	IRCC	1994	Lena Diab (Minister of Immigration, Refugees and Citizenship)	Ted Gallivan (Deputy Minister)	Agencies: Citizenship Commission; Programs: Language Instruction for Newcomers to Canada; Seasonal Agricultural Workers Program; Review Body: Immigration and Refugee Board of Canada
Indigenous Services	ISC	2019	Mandy Gull-Masty (Minister of Indigenous Services)	Michelle Kovacevic (Deputy Minister)	Special Operating Agency: Indian Oil and Gas; Review Body: Specific Claims Tribunal
Innovation, Science and Economic Development	ISED	1993	Mélanie Joly (Minister of Industry) Evan Solomon (Minister of Artificial Intelligence and Digital Innovation)	Philip Jennings (Deputy Minister)	Agencies: Canadian Space Agency; John H. Chapman Space Center; David Florida Laboratory; Communications Research Centre Canada; Corporations Canada; National Research Council; Herzberg Institute of Astrophysics; National Institute for Nanotechnology; National Science Library; Office of Consumer Affairs; Office of the Superintendent of Bankruptcy; Statistics Canada; Canada Periodical Fund; Funding agencies: Canada Research Chair; Natural Sciences and Engineering Research Council; Social Sciences and Humanities Research Council; Regional Economic Development Agencies Main article: Regional Development Agency (Canada): Atlantic Canada Opportunities Agency; Canada Economic Development for Quebec Regions; Federal Economic Development Agency for Southern Ontario; Federal Economic Development Agency for Northern Ontario; Canadian Northern Economic Development Agency; Pacific Economic Development Canada; Prairies Economic Development Canada; Enforcement agency: Competition Bureau; Special Operating Agencies: Canadian Intellectual Property Office; Patent Appeal Board; Trademarks Opposition Board; Measurement Canada; Crown corporations: Business Development Bank of Canada; Destination Canada; Standards Council of Canada; Non-profit organizations: Canada Foundation for Innovation; Genome Canada; Regulator: Copyright Board of Canada; Review Body: Competition Tribunal; Office of the Commissioner of Competition
Justice	JUS	1868	Sean Fraser (Minister of Justice and Attorney General)	Marie-Josée Hogue (Deputy Minister and Deputy Attorney General)	Agencies: Administrative Tribunals Support Service of Canada; Courts Administration Service; Judicial Compensation and Benefits Commission; Public Prosecution Service of Canada; Registrar of the Supreme Court of Canada; Review body: Office of the Federal Ombudsman for Victims of Crime
National Defence	DND	1923	David McGuinty (Minister of National Defence)	Christiane Fox (Deputy Minister) General Jennie Carignan (Chief of Defence Staff)	Agency: Canadian Forces Morale and Welfare Services; Intelligence agency: Communications Security Establishment; Special Operating Agencies: Canadian Forces Housing Agency; Canadian Coast Guard; Defence Research and Development Canada; Program: Canadian Cadet Organizations; National Search and Rescue Program; Joint Rescue Coordination Centres; Civil Air Search and Rescue Association; Review bodies: Military Police Complaints Commission; Military Grievances External Review Committee; Independent Review Panel for Defence Acquisition; Office of the National Defence and Canadian Forces Ombudsman
Natural Resources	NRCan	1994	Tim Hodgson (Minister of Energy and Natural Resources)	Greg Orencsak (Deputy Minister)	Agencies: Canadian Forest Service; Energy Supplies Allocation Board; Geographical Names Board of Canada; Geological Survey of Canada; Northern Pipeline Agency Canada; Nuclear Waste Management Organization; Crown corporation: Atomic Energy of Canada Limited; Chalk River Laboratories; Whiteshell Laboratories; Petroleum Boards: Canada-Newfoundland and Labrador Offshore Petroleum Board; Canada-Nova Scotia Offshore Petroleum Board; Regulators: Canadian Energy Regulator; Canadian Nuclear Safety Commission
Public Safety	PS	2003	Gary Anandasangaree (Minister of Public Safety) Eleanor Olszewski (Minister of Emergency Management and Community Resilience)	Tricia Geddes (Deputy Minister)	Agency: Correctional Service of Canada; Canadian Anti-Fraud Centre; Enforcement agencies: Canada Border Services Agency; Royal Canadian Mounted Police; Canadian Firearms Program; Canadian Police College; Canadian Police Information Centre; Criminal Intelligence Service Canada; Integrated National Security Enforcement Teams; Parliamentary Protective Service; Intelligence agency: Canadian Security Intelligence Service; Integrated Terrorism Assessment Centre; Review bodies: Civilian Review and Complaints Commission for the Royal Canadian Mounted Police; Office of the Correctional Investigator; Parole Board of Canada; RCMP External Review Committee
Public Services and Procurement	PSPC	1996	Joël Lightbound (Minister of Government Transformation, Public Services and Procurement; Receiver General)	Arianne Reza (Deputy Minister; Deputy Receiver-General)	Agency: Defence Investment Agency; Shared Services Canada; Special Operating Agency: Translation Bureau; Crown corporations: Canada Lands Company; Canada Post; Defence Construction Canada; National Capital Commission; Review Body: Office of the Procurement Ombudsman
Transport	TC	1935	Steven MacKinnon (Minister of Transport)	Michael Vandergrift (Deputy Minister)	Agencies: Office of Boating Safety; Transport Canada Civil Aviation Directorate; Transport Canada Marine Safety; Crown corporations: Alto; Atlantic Pilotage Authority; Buffalo and Fort Erie Public Bridge Authority; Canadian Air Transport Security Authority; Federal Bridge Corporation; Great Lakes Pilotage Authority; Laurentian Pilotage Authority; Marine Atlantic; PortsToronto; Ridley Terminals Inc.; Pacific Pilotage Authority; Via Rail; Halifax Port Authority; Harbour of Québec; Montreal Port Authority; Nanaimo Port Authority; Oshawa-Hamilton Port Authority; Port Alberni Port Authority; Prince Rupert Port Authority; Quebec Port Authority; Saguenay Port Authority; Saint John Port Authority; Sept-Îles Port Authority; St. John's Port Authority; Thunder Bay Port Authority; Trois-Rivières Port Authority; Vancouver Fraser Port Authority; Windsor Port Authority; Belledune Port Authority; Enforcement Agency: Via Rail Police; Transport Inspector; Funds: Fund for Railway Accidents Involving Designated Goods; Ship-source Oil Pollution Fund; Review bodies: Canadian Transportation Agency; Transportation Appeal Tribunal of Canada
Veterans Affairs	VAC	1944	Jill McKnight (Minister of Veterans Affairs and Associate Minister of National Defence)	Nancy Gardiner (Deputy Minister)	Agencies: Bureau of Pensions Advocates; Review bodies: Veterans Review and Appeal Board; Office of the Veterans Ombudsman
Women and Gender Equality	WAGE	2018	Rechie Valdez (Minister of Women and Gender Equality)	Frances McRae (Deputy Minister)	None

==== Separate agency with direct ministerial oversight ====
Agency	Abbreviation	Established	Minister	Deputy head	Associated entity
Canada Revenue Agency	CRA	2003 1867 (historic)	François-Philippe Champagne (Minister of National Revenue)	Bob Hamilton (Commissioner of Revenue)	Review body: Office of the Taxpayers Ombudsperson

==== Independent agencies and offices ====
- Canadian Judicial Council
- National Judicial Institute
- National Security and Intelligence Review Agency
- Office of the Commissioner for Federal Judicial Affairs
- Office of the Chief Military Judge
- Public Service Commission of Canada
- Transportation Safety Board

==== Independent review bodies ====
- Federal Public Sector Labour Relations and Employment Board
- Public Servants Disclosure Protection Tribunal
- Canadian Human Rights Commission
- Canadian Human Rights Tribunal

=== Canadian Armed Forces ===
Branch	Abbreviation	Established	Minister	Commander
Canadian Army	CA	1855	David McGuinty	Michael Wright
Canadian Forces Intelligence Command	CFINTCOM	2013	David McGuinty	Dave Abboud
Canadian Joint Operations Command	CJOC	2012	David McGuinty	Steve Boivin
Canadian Special Operations Forces Command	CANSOFCOM	2006	David McGuinty	Steve Hunter
Royal Canadian Air Force	RCAF	1914	David McGuinty	Jamie Speiser-Blanchet
Royal Canadian Navy	RCN	1910	David McGuinty	Angus Topshee
Canadian Forces Military Police	CFMP	1917	David McGuinty	Vanessa Hanrahan

== Parliament ==
=== Senate of Canada ===
==== Procedural officers ====
- Speaker of the Senate
- Clerk of the Senate and Clerk of the Parliaments
- Usher of the Black Rod of the Senate of Canada

==== Standing committees ====
- Aboriginal Peoples
- Agriculture and Forestry
- Banking, Trade, and Commerce
- Ethics and Conflict of Interest for Senators
- Energy, the Environment and Natural Resources
- Fisheries and Oceans
- Foreign Affairs and International Trade
- Human Rights
- Internal Economy, Budgets, and Administration
  - Diversity subcommittee
  - Human Resources subcommittee
  - Senate Estimates subcommittee
- Legal and Constitutional Affairs
- National Finance
- National Security and Defence
- Official Languages
- Rules, Procedure and the Rights of Parliament
- Selection Committee
- Social Affairs, Science and Technology
- Transport and Communication

=== House of Commons of Canada ===
==== Procedural officers ====
- Speaker of the House of Commons
- Clerk of the House of Commons
- Deputy Clerk of the House of Commons
- Clerk Assistant
- Law Clerk and Parliamentary Counsel
- Sergeant-at-Arms

==== Standing committees ====
- Access to Information, Privacy and Ethics
- Agriculture and Agri-Food
- Canadian Heritage
- Citizenship and Immigration
- Environment and Sustainable Development
- Finance
- Fisheries and Oceans
- Foreign Affairs and International Development
- Government Operations and Estimates
- Health
- Human Resources, Skills and Social Development and
  the Status of Persons with Disabilities
- Indigenous and Northern Affairs
- Industry, Science and Technology
- International Trade
- Justice and Human Rights
- National Defence
- Natural Resources
- Official Languages
- Procedure and House Affairs
- Public Accounts
- Public Safety and National Security
- Status of Women
- Transport, Infrastructure and Communities
- Veterans Affairs

=== Joint Standing Committees ===
- Exercise of Powers Under the Building Canada Act
- Library of Parliament
- Scrutiny of Regulations

=== Officers of Parliament ===
- Auditor General of Canada
- Commissioner of Lobbying of Canada
- Conflict of Interest and Ethics Commissioner of Canada
- Information Commissioner of Canada
- Intelligence Commissioner of Canada
- Elections Canada
- Privacy Commissioner of Canada
- Public Sector Integrity Commissioner of Canada
- Parliamentary Budget Officer

=== Agencies ===
- Parliamentary Protective Service

=== Review bodies ===
- National Security and Intelligence Committee of Parliamentarians

== Courts ==
- Supreme Court of Canada
- Federal Court of Appeal
- Court Martial Appeal Court of Canada
- Federal Court of Canada
- Tax Court of Canada

== See also ==
- Civil Service Act, 1918
- Special Operating Agency
- State-owned enterprise
  - Canadian Crown Corporation
- Canadian Coast Guard Auxiliary
- Royal Canadian Marine Search and Rescue
- PPP Canada
- Sustainable Development Technology Canada

=== Provincial and territorial equivalents ===
- Executive Council of Alberta
- Executive Council of British Columbia
- Executive Council of Manitoba
- Executive Council of Newfoundland and Labrador
- Executive Council of New Brunswick
- Executive Council of Nova Scotia
- Executive Council of Ontario
- Executive Council of Prince Edward Island
- Executive Council of Quebec
- Executive Council of Saskatchewan
- Executive Council of the Northwest Territories
- Executive Council of Nunavut
- Executive Council of Yukon
- Government of Alberta
- Government of British Columbia
- Government of Manitoba
- Government of Newfoundland and Labrador
- Government of New Brunswick
- Government of Nova Scotia
- Government of Ontario
- Government of Prince Edward Island
- Government of Quebec
- Government of Saskatchewan
