= Canadian Internet Registration Authority =

Canada's .CA registry

CIRA
- Canadian Internet Registration Authority
- Abbreviation: CIRA
- Predecessor: University of British Columbia
- Formation: 1998-12-30
- Type: Non-Soliciting
- Registration no.: 357494-6
- Legal status: Active
- Purpose: Authority for ccTLD .CA
- Headquarters: 319 McRae Avenue, Suite 700
- Location: Ottawa, Ontario, Canada
- Services: Management of .CA domain, Cybersecurity services, Registry services
- Official language: English, French
- Key people: Byron Holland; (President and CEO)
- Website: cira.ca

The Canadian Internet Registration Authority (CIRA; French: Autorité canadienne pour les enregistrements internet, ACEI) is the organization that manages the .ca country code top-level domain (ccTLD) for Canada. Its offices are located at 319 McRae Avenue in Ottawa, Ontario, Canada. CIRA sets the policies and agendas that support Canada's internet community and Canada's involvement in international internet governance. It is a member-driven organization with membership open to all that hold a .ca domain. As of March 2023, there were more than 3.3 million active .ca domains.

== History ==
=== Inception ===
In May 1987, the Information Sciences Institute at the University of Southern California, delegated the ccTLD .ca to the University of British Columbia (UBC) in Vancouver, British Columbia, Canada. The university was named the sponsoring delegation for .ca. John Demco, the university's computing facilities manager for the Department of Computer Science, would be its administrator and technical contact. For ten years, under his leadership, a group of volunteers managed the .ca domain.

In 1997, the Canadian internet community, part of an evolving and rapidly expanding internet, wanted changes with the administration of the .ca domain. After its annual conference, it formed the Canadian Domain Names Consultation Committee. After public consultations, the committee's recommendation was to form a private-sector, not-for-profit corporation to administer the .ca domain in Canada.

On 30 December 1998, the Canadian Internet Registration Authority was incorporated, and in an 11 March 1999 letter, the Government of Canada officially recognized CIRA as the authority to manage the .ca domain for Canada. On 9 May 2000, CIRA, the University of British Columbia, and the Government of Canada entered into an umbrella agreement that stated: "the .ca domain space should be developed as a key public resource for social and economic development for all Canadians".

On 10 October 2000, Industry Canada sent a letter to the Internet Corporation for Assigned Names and Numbers (ICANN) formally designating CIRA as the Government of Canada's designee for the .ca domain. On 30 November 2000, CIRA sent ICANN a letter requesting a redelegation of the ccTLD .ca domain, effective 1 December 2000. ICANN agreed, and on that day, the ccTLD .ca was redelegated to CIRA, effectively transitioning all .ca domains from UBC to CIRA. By 30 November 2000, it had registered approximately 120,000 .ca domain names.

In March 2001, CIRA initiated the process to elect its first board of directors. In May 2001, it opened its offices in Ottawa, Ontario and in June 2001, it held a public election for its initial twelve directors. Its first annual general meeting was held 1 December 2001 in Toronto, Ontario.

=== Milestones ===
In April 2008, CIRA announced that it had surpassed 1 million registered .ca domains. It announced in October 2009, that it would initiate testing for securing the .ca domain space using DNSSEC.

In 2010, CIRA stopped accepting new registrations for third-level domains like "example.on.ca", which prior to CIRA's inception, were imposed on registrants wanting a second-level domain like "example.ca", but who could not meet the domain name registry's (UBC) standing requirements. Also in 2010, it announced it had reached 1.5 million registered .ca domains, and it launched a national consultation called the Canadian Internet Forum, designed to engage Canadians on internet governance and policy.

In 2012, CIRA announced it had already reached 2 million .ca registered domains. That year it launched Internationalized Domain Names (IDNs). In 2014, CIRA started a Community Investment Program, and in 2015, launched the Internet Performance Test initiative.

== Additional activities ==
=== Security ===
In September 2012, CIRA held a DNSSEC key signing ceremony, and published its first signed .ca zone file in January 2013. In 2014, it launched its D-Zone DNS firewall and introduced Anycast DNS. A year after its launch, D-Zone was protecting 800,000 users from malware, ransomware and other cyber-attacks in schools, hospitals, municipalities and small businesses across Canada. In June 2016 it announced delivering a white-label Anycast version of D-Zone. In June 2018, CIRA announced a partnership with the Canadian Centre for Child Protection, safeguarding K-12 schools by incorporating data from its Project Arachnid into its D-Zone platform.

=== CIRA Registry Platform ===
In July 2016, CIRA announced it would be offering its back-end registry service called FURY, to gTLDs and ccTLDs around the world. Its first gTLD customer was .kiwi in October 2016. The first ccTLD would be .sx which went live on FURY in November 2017. In 2019, its second and largest ccTLD .ca was added to the platform, and later it added gTLD .mls. In November 2020 .ie completed the process of migrating its backend registration platform to a customised version called Titan.

== Controversy ==
In March 2006, Clyde Beattie, former chair of the CIRA board of directors and Bernard Turcotte, former president and CEO of CIRA sent an open letter to ICANN expressing concerns on ICANN's "accountability", "transparency", and "fair processes".

CIRA has itself invited concerns and controversy by changing the make-up of its board of directors, and by removing the reference to "registration" from a clause in its letters patent, allowing it to now go beyond its original mandate by venturing into more lucrative commercial endeavours.

In 2014, Mark Jeftovic, a former CIRA director, and co-founder of easyDNS Technologies Inc, an accredited ICANN domain name registrar, and CIRA certified, sent an open letter to Canada's industry minister, the Honorable James Moore. In his letter, he expressed his concerns about CIRA entering the business of managed DNS, while having a monopoly to operate the ccTLD .ca registry. He proposed the registry be opened to a competitive bidding process, in order to operate it under a fixed three to five-year term.

== Governance ==
The CIRA board is composed of twelve elected directors and currently, three non-voting board advisors. The board members are elected annually by CIRA members through an online process.

=== Board of directors ===
The current board of directors as of January 2025:

- Jill Kolwalchuck – chair, Board of Directors
- Gwen Beauchemin – Vice-chair, Board of Directors
- Colleen Arnold – chair, Finance, Audit, Investment & Risk Management (FAIR) Committee
- Graeme Bunton - Director
- Anne Butler, Chair – Governance Committee
- Hélène Deschamps Marquis – Director
- Matthew Gamble – chair, Community Investment, Policy & Advocacy Committee
- David Mackey - Director
- Crystal Nett - Director
- Rob Villeneuve - chair, Compensation & Review Committee
- Michael Zahra – Director
- John Demco - Director
- Byron Holland - President & CEO; Board Advisor

=== Board advisors ===
The current board advisors as of March 2023:

- Byron Holland – Board Advisor, President, CEO
- John Demco – Board Advisor
- Heather Dryden – Board Advisor, Innovation, Science and Economic Development Canada

=== Leadership team ===
The current leadership team as of December 2025:

- Byron Holland – President and CEO
- Sanita Alias – Vice-president, People, Culture & Brand
- Adam Eisner – Vice-president, .CA & Registry Services
- John Ferguson – Vice-president, Cybersecurity and DNS Services
- Jane Fulford – Chief Operating Officer
- Charles Noir – Vice-president, Community Investment, Policy & Advocacy

== See also ==
- .ca
- .gc.ca
