= .gc.ca =

Second-level domain

.gc.ca is a privately held second-level domain in the .ca top-level domain. It is used by the Government of Canada and operated by Government Telecommunications and Informatics Services, which holds all third level domains under the .gc.ca banner.

In 2012, the government of Canada launched a plan to move all federal government sites to a single domain, "canada.ca". However, much of the plan was abandoned in 2017, with only a handful of departments and agencies such as the Canada Revenue Agency relocating; most government sites will remain under their domains for the foreseeable future.

In addition to many official government websites, a process has been implemented where many of the Canadian diplomatic mission locations also have gc.ca domains as well. (i.e. the Canadian High Commission in Barbados has a forwarding service from "barbados.gc.ca", or similarly the Consulate-General in Boston as "boston.gc.ca".)

== Government entities with a domain name under .gc.ca ==
- Prime Minister of Canada
- Auditor General of Canada
- Supreme Court of Canada
- Health Canada
- Royal Canadian Mounted Police
- Department of National Defence (Canada)
- Canadian Armed Forces—operates separate websites for the army, navy and air force
- Department of Finance (Canada)
- Statistics Canada
- Transport Canada
- Meteorological Service of Canada
- Library of Parliament
- House of Commons
- Senate of Canada
- Canadian Human Rights Tribunal
- Canadian Nuclear Safety Commission
- Canadian Radio-television and Telecommunications Commission
- Department of Justice (Canada)
- Criminal Intelligence Service Canada
- Canadian Security Intelligence Service
- Correctional Service of Canada
- Parole Board of Canada
- Fisheries and Oceans Canada
- Natural Resources Canada
- Canada Border Services Agency
- National Capital Commission
- Natural Resources Canada
- National Research Council Canada
- National Energy Board
- Patented Medicine Prices Review Board
- Shared Services Canada
- Canadian Institutes of Health Research
- Canadian Police College
- Canadian Forces College
- Global Affairs Canada
- Canada School of Public Service
- Public Safety Canada
- Housing, Infrastructure and Communities Canada
- Office of the Veterans Ombudsman
- National Capital Commission
- Agriculture and Agri-Food Canada
- Canada Agricultural Review Tribunal
- Canada Development Investment Corporation
- Canada Energy Regulator
- Canada Industrial Relations Board
- Canada Mortgage and Housing Corporation
- Canada Research Chairs
- Canadian Air Transport Security Authority
- Canadian Coast Guard
- Canadian Cultural Property Export Review Board
- Canadian Grain Commission
- Innovation, Science and Economic Development Canada
- Canadian International Trade Tribunal
- Canadian Northern Economic Development Agency
- Canadian Space Agency
- Trade Commissioner Service
- Civilian Review and Complaints Commission for the Royal Canadian Mounted Police
- Office of the Commissioner for Federal Judicial Affairs Canada
- Office of the Commissioner of Lobbying of Canada
- Office of the Commissioner of Official Languages
- Communications Research Centre Canada
- Competition Bureau Canada
- Competition Tribunal
- Office of the Conflict of Interest and Ethics Commissioner
- Copyright Board of Canada
- Office of the Correctional Investigator
- Courts Administration Service
- Defence Construction Canada
- Environmental Protection Tribunal of Canada
- Federal Court of Appeal
- Federal Court
- Federal Economic Development Agency for Southern Ontario
- Office of the Federal Ombudsman for Victims of Crime
- Parks Canada
- Canadian Human Rights Tribunal
- Indian Oil and Gas Canada
- Information Commissioner of Canada
- Judicial Compensation and Benefits Commission
- Laurentian Pilotage Authority
- Library and Archives Canada
- National Battlefields Commission
- National Security and Intelligence Review Agency
- Natural Resources Canada
- Pacific Pilotage Authority
- Privacy Commissioner of Canada
- Public Prosecution Service of Canada
- Public Sector Integrity Commissioner
- Public Servants Disclosure Protection Tribunal
- Public Services and Procurement Canada
- Social Sciences and Humanities Research Council
- Office of the Superintendent of Financial Institutions
- Tax Court of Canada
- Transportation Appeal Tribunal of Canada
- Western Economic Diversification Canada
- Women and Gender Equality Canada
