= 1985 Polar Sea controversy =

Canada-United States diplomatic dispute

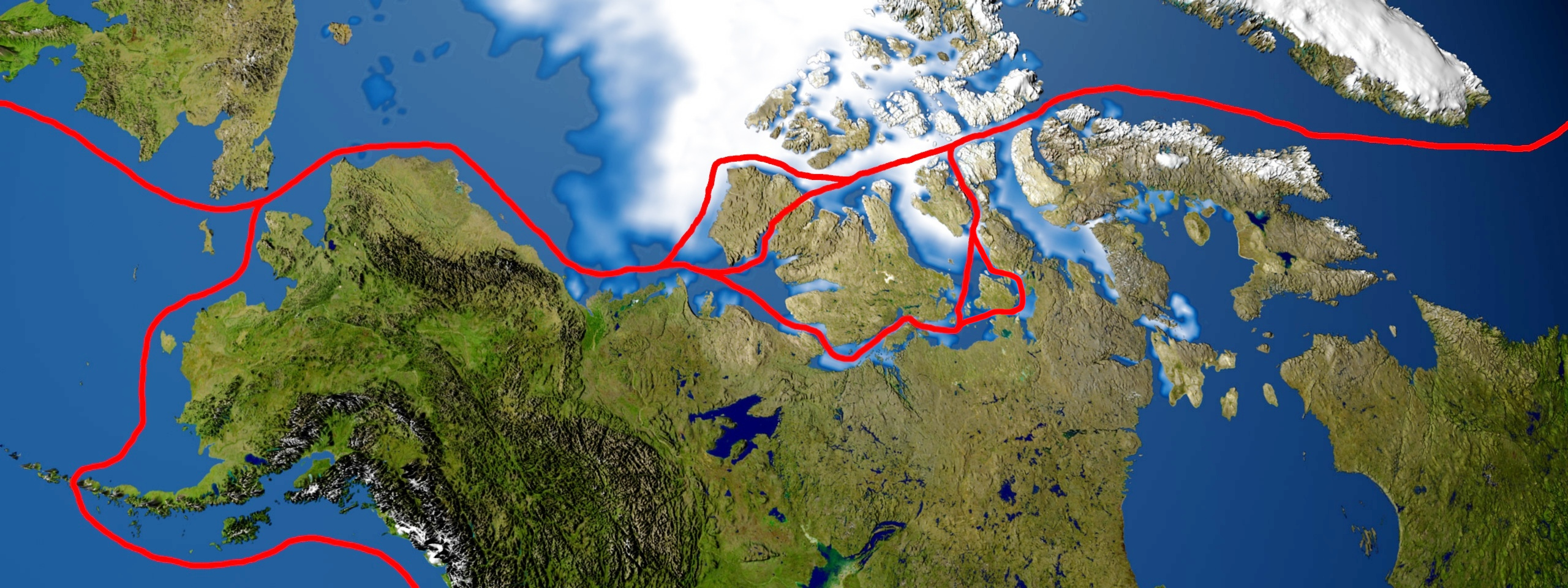
Northwest Passage routes

The 1985 Polar Sea controversy was a diplomatic event triggered by plans for the navigation of USCGC Polar Sea through the Northwest Passage from Greenland to Alaska without formal authorization from the Canadian government. It was the United States' position that the Northwest Passage was an international strait open to shipping and it sought only to notify Canada rather than ask for permission.

Publication of the plans enraged the Canadian public opinion as it was regarded as a breach and disregard of sovereignty and prompted the government to take preventive measures in defending Canada's arctic territories. The U.S. never recognized Canada's claim over the Northwest passage but nevertheless, the two countries reached an agreement two years later which stipulated that in the future, the U.S. would ask permission before navigating the disputed waters.

Canada's sovereignty over the region's waters was still a contentious issue as of 2010 and is likely to become of increasing importance as climate change in the Arctic has the potential to render those waters more accessible to commercial ships and the thawing of the sea ice of making oil drilling easier.

== Background ==
=== Exploring ===
Ever since the colonization of America, the Northwest Passage had always been of special interest since it was speculated that it could offer a shortcut to Asia. Many attempts at crossing were made but very few succeeded due to the very unforgiving conditions that prevail in the Canadian Arctic for most of the year. The British explorer Sir John Franklin actually found a passage between 1845 and 1847 but this achievement was not known until years later as he and his crew had perished on the journey. Robert McClure was the first explorer to survive the expedition in 1850 but he completed the journey on a sled. It is only in 1906 that the passage was navigated entirely on water by the Norwegian explorer Roald Amundsen. However, construction of the Panama Canal had already begun at that time and its completion in 1914 lessened the need for this route.

=== The Cold War ===
It was not until the Second World War that the passage was again explored. With the onset of the Cold War, the Canadian Arctic became the first line of defense against the Soviets so the U.S. and Canada developed a tight cooperation as the imperative to use this mostly empty territory as a buffer increased. Thus, many early warning systems such as the DEW Line, the Pinetree Line and the Mid-Canada Line were deployed in this region with the North Warning System still in use today.

=== SS Manhattan and the Arctic Waters Pollution Prevention Act ===
Following the discovery of large oil reserves in Alaska, the urge to make the Northwest Passage navigable rose substantially. In 1969, the ice-strengthened oil tanker SS Manhattan made the full voyage with the help of Canadian and American icebreakers. While the voyage was carried out with much difficulty, the mere fact that it was possible for a commercial ship to make it from Alaska to the East Coast was of much significance and prompted many questions over the passage's status. Despite the cooperation of the two countries and the presence of observers on the tanker, public opinion reacted over this alleged breach of sovereignty, pushing the Canadian government to enact the Arctic Waters Pollution Prevention Act of 1970. The act contained a reservation precluding it from review from the World Court which was removed in 1985 but at the time of the Polar Sea controversy, the act could still be considered unilateral.

== Voyage ==
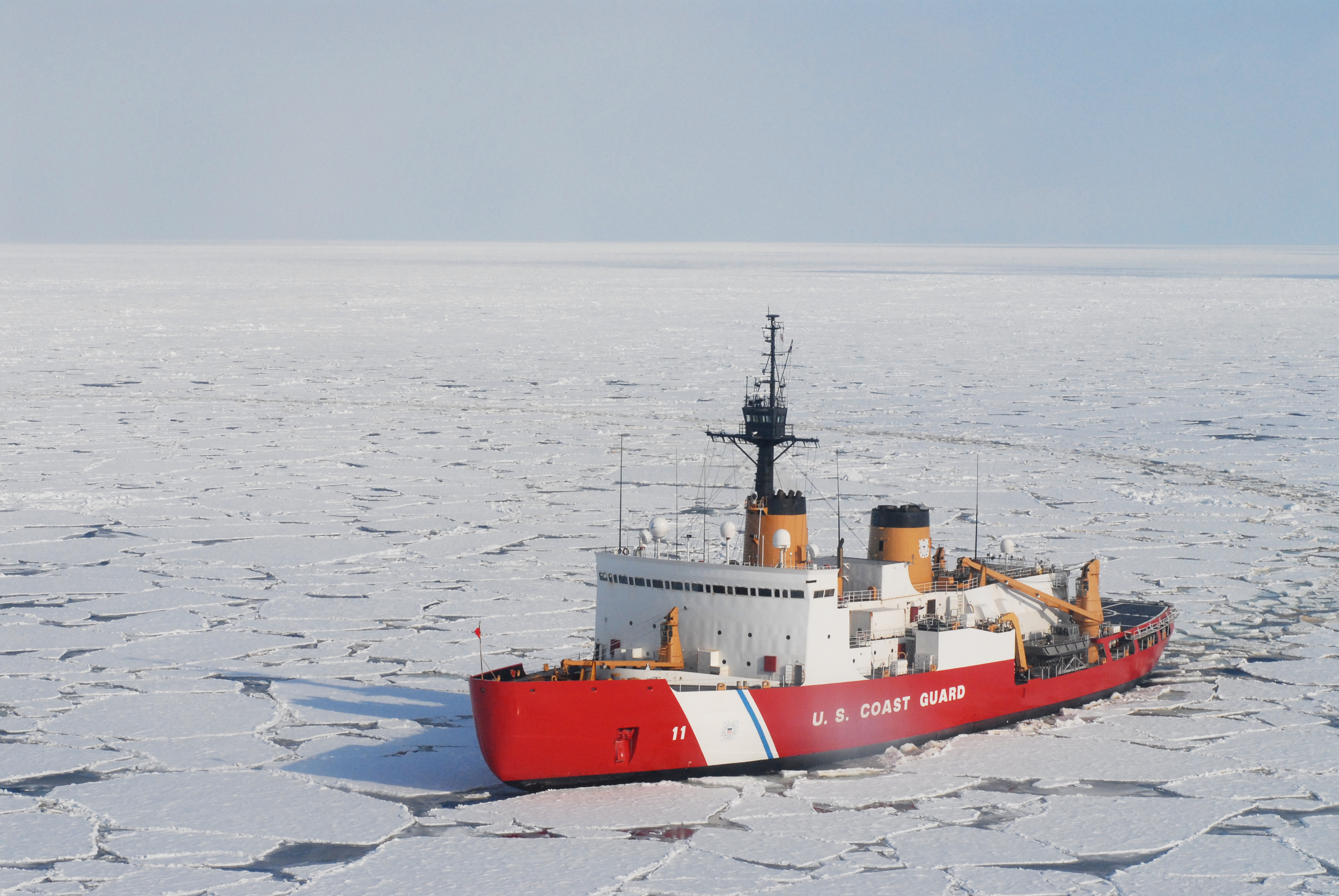
USCGC Polar Sea (WAGB-11)

In 1985, USCGC Polar Sea sparked controversy by navigating the Northwest passage from Greenland to Alaska without formal authorization from the Canadian government. At the time, Polar Sea was on a routine resupply operation and it was deemed by the United States Coast Guard that utilizing the Northwest Passage instead of the Panama Canal would yield considerable savings in time. Permission for the voyage was not officially sought by the United States government because of its position that the Northwest Passage is an international strait open to shipping. Conversely, the Canadian government opinion was that the passage was within Canada's border. Still, Canada was notified of the impending voyage and decided to cooperate with the Americans so as not to prejudice each state's legal position amidst a climate already made tense by the Cold War. Hence, it provided Canadian observers that were to stay aboard the ship for its entire resupply operation. As plans for the icebreaker's voyage became public, controversy arose in parliament with sides claiming the icebreaker's voyage would violate sovereignty while others stated it did not and called the argument "deliberately anti-American".

== Controversy ==
Weighted against the strategic and economic interests in maintaining the status quo, it was deemed that the political risks incurred by the voyage of Polar Sea in 1985 were worth taking so it was decided that Polar Sea should proceed.

The magnitude of the reaction was underestimated and pressures from the public opinion on the Mulroney government forced it to take preventive measures. First were the Inuit populations of the region who were concerned about the risks that an unregulated commercial passage would threaten their livelihood and compromise their ethnic integrity. Then, nationalists groups further increased pressure on the government through editorials in the press and public protests. One group even announced plans during the Polar Sea voyage to place Canadian flags across the path of the icebreaker. This actual plan was not carried out but Canadian students and Inuit activists managed to drop leaflets in a cylinder wrapped with a Canadian Flag onto the deck of the ship near Melville Island. Their message requested that the crew return the icebreaker to international waters. Finally, the Soviet diplomacy spoke in support of the public outcry by stating that it believed in Canada's right to sovereignty on its Northwest passage just like the USSR believed the Northeast Passage belonged to them.

The U.S. did not at the time recognize Canada's rights to the Northwest Passage. Interviewed following the USSR's statement, the Bureau of European and Canadian Affairs simply replied that it "can only repeat that the U.S. government believes the same navigational principles to apply to both passages. They are international straits. To say more than that would be speculative." In alignment with its foreign policy and as mandated by its geographical situation, the United States had consistently defended its right under international law to transit international straits and routes. Even when it formally ended its advocacy of the three-mile limit in 1971, it urged the United Nations Committee on Peaceful use of the Seabed to agree upon a twelve mile limit except when it changed the character of international straits.

== Aftermath ==
=== Canada's reaction ===
In a storm of critics and letters at the government's insufficient icebreaker fleet and lenient attitude together with the increasing concern that the voyage would undermine Canada's sovereignty and set a precedent, the Mulroney government decided to take action. On 10 September 1985, invoking historic title as the basis for its claims, an order in council was passed that established straight baselines around the outer perimeter of the country, thereby affirming the Northwest Passage to be Canadian waters while vowing to enforce the Arctic Waters Pollution Prevention Act. Promises of increased naval and air patrolling were made; notably a program termed the Polar 8 Project was also announced which proposed the construction of new class of high endurance icebreakers. That program was eventually canceled in 1990 due to budget cuts.

=== U.S. position ===
This order contradicted the U.S. ocean's policy and was disapproved of on the basis of its unilateralism and its restrictions on the rights and freedom of the international community in navigation and flight of the high seas. Moreover, the U.S. had not ratified the United Nations Convention on the Law of the Sea of 1982 which Canada used in claiming new baselines for its coasts.

However, the rising concern of new generation Soviet nuclear submarine capability along with Canada's intention to build its own fleet of such vessels and potentially interfering with American presence in the area prompted for a quick resolution of this issue. It was the Pentagon's view that an increased assertion of Canada's sovereignty in the north would compromise its ability to deploy forces for the defense of Europe.

=== Agreement ===
On 11 January 1988, the U.S. secretary of state George Shultz and the Canadian Foreign secretary Joe Clark signed the Agreement on Arctic Cooperation. The two key clauses of this agreement were as follows:

The Government of the United States pledges that all navigation by U.S. icebreakers within waters claimed by Canada to be internal will be undertaken with the consent of the Government of Canada.

Nothing in this agreement of cooperative endeavor between Arctic neighbors and friends nor any practice thereunder affects the respective position of the Governments of the United States and Canada on the Law of the Sea in this or other maritime areas or their respective positions regarding third parties.

This agreement being de facto rather than de jure, it held no ground on international law. Nevertheless, it was the opinion of Canadian officials that any U.S. request for passage would only bolster Canada's argument for sovereignty should the issue come before an international court. The U.S. were diligent in honoring their word, requesting passage under this agreement for USCGC Polar Star in October 1988 when she was barred by an early surge of ice, preventing her return to her home port of Seattle through the Bering Strait. Regarding the U.S. cooperation in solving this diplomatic predicament, Prime Minister Brian Mulroney pointed out that "One of the great ironies of the position taken by the United States, if followed to its logical conclusion, is that it could lead to much further freedom of navigation in the Arctic for the Soviets."

== Today ==
As of 2020, Canada's sovereignty over the region's waters is still a contentious issue. Many other potential infringements of Canada's territorial claims (especially by military vessels, which sometimes operate under secrecy) were committed after the controversy. (Note: Most of the activities involving American submarines (including their current and past positions and courses) are classified, so therefore under that policy the U.S. Navy has declined to reveal which route(s) the Charlotte took to reach and return from the Pole.) Despite this, the U.S. Coast Guard has remained respectful of the agreement resulting from the controversy, which has helped to foster cooperation with the Canadian coast guard in protecting the interests of the two countries in the Arctic and solving this dispute once and for all. This cooperation notably includes an ongoing joint program with the goal of gathering geological data that could help in delineating the continental shelf. This data would in turn help towards the preparation of a submission to the United Nations Commission on the Limits of the Continental Shelf for 2013 with the intention of fixing precise limits on where Canada may exercise sovereignty in the region.

Technological advances and a changing security environment made the sovereignty issue fall out of the spotlight in both countries, but recently, there has been renewed interest due to climate change making passage more accessible to commercial ships and oil drilling easier. As a result, Canada is seeing an upraise in political will towards international recognition of its rights over the region.

== See also ==
- Canada–United States relations
- Northwest Passage
- Territorial claims in the Arctic
- Arctic exploration
- Arctic cooperation and politics

== Sources ==
- Briggs, Phillip J. (April 1990). "The Polar Sea Voyage and the Northwest Passage Dispute". Armed Forces & Society. 16 (3). Sage: 437–452. doi:10.1177/0095327X9001600308. S2CID 145215083.
- Killaby, Lieutenant-Commander Guy (Winter 2005–2006). ""Great Game in a Cold Climate": Canada's Arctic Sovereignty in Question" (PDF). Canadian Military Journal. 6 (4).
