= .ca =

Top-level Internet domain for Canada

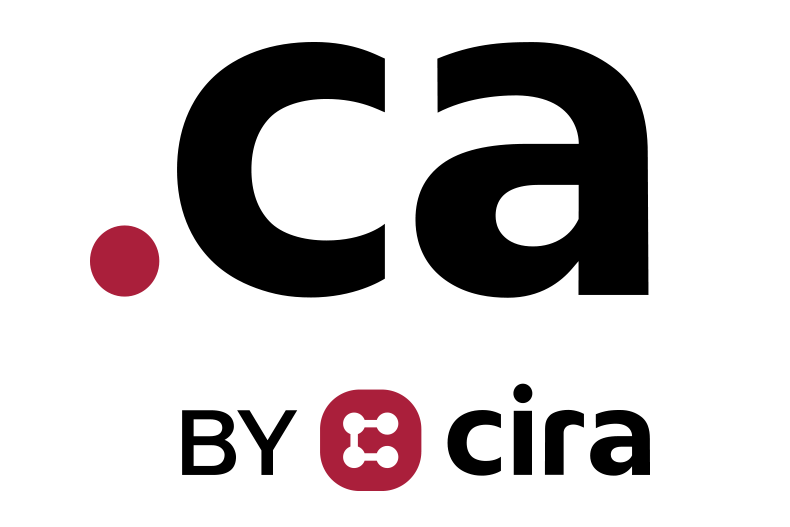
- Introduced: May 14, 1987; 39 years ago
- TLD type: Country code top-level domain
- Status: Active
- Registry: Canadian Internet Registration Authority
- Sponsor: Government of Canada
- Intended use: Entities connected with Canada
- Actual use: Popular in Canada, where .ca is advantageous when selling to a Canadian audience in Canadian dollars.
- Registered domains: 3,383,905 (4 September 2024)
- Registration restrictions: There are Canadian presence requirements for registrants
- Structure: Provincially registered companies originally had to register at third level under province code, but now anybody may register at second level
- Documents: Official CIRA documents
- Dispute policies: CIRA Domain Name Dispute Resolution Policy (CDRP)
- DNSSEC: Yes
- Registry website: CIRA

.ca is the Internet country code top-level domain (ccTLD) for Canada. The domain name registry that operates it is the Canadian Internet Registration Authority (CIRA).

Registrants can register domains at the second level (e.g., example.ca). Third-level registrations in one of the geographic third-level domains defined by the registry (e.g. example.ab.ca) were discontinued on October 12, 2010, but existing third-level domain names continue to be supported.

== Canadian Presence Requirements ==
Registrants of .ca domains must meet the Canadian Presence Requirements as defined by the registry. Examples of valid entities include:

- a Canadian citizen or permanent resident of the age of majority
- a legally recognized Canadian organization
- an Inuit, First Nation, Métis or other people indigenous to Canada
- an Indian Band as defined in the Indian Act of Canada
- a foreign resident of Canada that holds a registered Canadian trademark
- an executor, administrator or other legal representative of a person or organization that meets the requirements
- a division of the government
- the monarch of Canada

== History ==
The domain name was originally allocated by Jon Postel, operator of Internet Assigned Numbers Authority (IANA), to John Demco of the University of British Columbia (UBC) in 1987. The first .ca domain was registered by the University of Prince Edward Island in January 1988.

In 1997, at the Canadian annual Internet conference in Halifax, Nova Scotia, the Canadian Internet community, with a view to liberalize registration procedures and substantially improve turnaround times, decided to undertake reform of the .ca Registry.

The Canadian Internet Registration Authority (CIRA) is a non-profit Canadian corporation that is responsible for operating the .ca Internet country code Top Level Domain (ccTLD) today. It assumed operation of the .ca ccTLD on December 1, 2000, from UBC. On April 15, 2008, CIRA registered its one millionth .ca Internet domain name.

Any .ca registration has to be ordered via a certified registrar.

== Third-level (provincial) and fourth-level (municipal) domains ==
UBC's registry operations once favoured fourth-level names (such as city.toronto.on.ca) for purely local entities or third-level names for entities operating solely within one province. Nationally incorporated companies could have a .ca domain, while provincially incorporated companies required the letters of their province, like .mb.ca. Only an entity with presence in two or more provinces was typically registered directly under .ca; this complex structure (and the long delays in getting .ca registration) caused many Canadian entities to favour the .com, .org and .net registrations, despite the then-higher cost.

Currently, any of the above listed parties can register a domain with a name of their choosing followed directly by .ca. CIRA stopped accepting new registrations for third-level domains on October 12, 2010, citing complexity and the low number of new third domain registration as the reason for the change. As a result, the following domains at the third-level are no longer available for registration:

Domain	Province/Territory
.ab.ca	Alberta
.bc.ca	British Columbia
.mb.ca	Manitoba
.nb.ca	New Brunswick
.nf.ca	Newfoundland
.nl.ca	Newfoundland and Labrador
.ns.ca	Nova Scotia
.nt.ca	Northwest Territories
.nu.ca	Nunavut
.on.ca	Ontario
.pe.ca	Prince Edward Island
.qc.ca	Quebec
.sk.ca	Saskatchewan
.yk.ca	Yukon

The second-level domain name '.gc.ca' (Government of Canada) is commonly mistaken as one of the regional domains under which CIRA will allow Government of Canada registrations. gc.ca is actually a standard domain like all other .ca domain names. CIRA does not register domain names under .gc.ca directly.

The .mil.ca second-level domain name is also a standard domain and is registered to the Department of National Defence (DND). The .mil.ca suffix is used internally by DND on its intranet, the Defence Information Network (DIN) or Defence Wide Area Network (DWAN), to distinguish intranet-only websites.

== Naming restrictions ==
Internationalized domain names (IDN) were introduced in January 2013 with a limited selection of characters (é, ë, ê, è, â, à, æ, ô, œ, ù, û, ü, ç, î, ï, ÿ) to allow French language text with diacritics. Names which differ only in diacritical accents (such as metro.ca and métro.ca) must have the same owner and same registrar. Domain names that begin with the four characters xn-- are otherwise not available for registration. Length must be 2-63 characters, including the xn-- prefix encoding for internationalized domain names.

Names which match the name of an existing generic three-letter top level domain (such as .com.ca) or the Canadian top level country code (.ca) are reserved and therefore not available for new registrations. Certain expletives are not accepted as names. Municipal names of individual cities and localities within Canada are also reserved nationwide, along with village.ca, hamlet.ca, town.ca, city.ca, ville.ca and the names of Canadian provinces.

There are a handful of existing .ca registered names as short as two characters in length, but these tend to be rare as two-letter combinations matching any existing country-code TLDs were reserved in the past. Exceptions were typically names registered before the restriction was introduced, such as the Canadian Governor General at gg.ca.

Names which exist at any of the levels (.ca, an individual province or territory, or an individual city) are blocked in their availability elsewhere in the .ca hierarchy. Registration, if it can be done at all, requires manual intervention by the prospective registrar as the permission of all existing registrant(s) must be obtained by CIRA. For instance, if the province of New Brunswick were to want to register "gouv.nb.ca", CIRA's normal automated WHOIS and registration tools would simply return the following error:

The domain name provided conflicts with at least one other registered domain name (e.g. xyz.ca conflicts with xyz.on.ca). Registering this domain name requires permission from the Registrant(s) that already holds the domain name(s): gouv.on.ca, gouv.pe.ca, gouv.qc.ca. Contact CIRA for more information.

Since Ontario, Prince Edward Island and Quebec already use "gouv" on their provincial second-level domains for the French-language versions of their government websites, this domain is unavailable through the normal registration process. However, with the agreement of these three parties New Brunswick would indeed be able to register and use gouv.nb.ca.

Existing third-level domain registrants looking to obtain the corresponding second-level domain are normally advised to use the same initial registrar for both names.

== Expired domains ==
After a thirty-day redemption period, intended to provide the original registrant one final chance to reclaim a suspended name, the expired names are assigned a to-be-released (TBR) status. These names are made available through a weekly auction process, in which lists of available names are posted online and advance bids are placed by prospective registrants through the various .ca registrars.

Domains which receive no bids are then released and made openly available for new registrations.

== See also ==
- .quebec
- Internet in Canada
- Canadian Internet Registration Authority
- ca.gov (California)
