= Off-track betting =

Sanctioned gambling on horse racing outside a race track

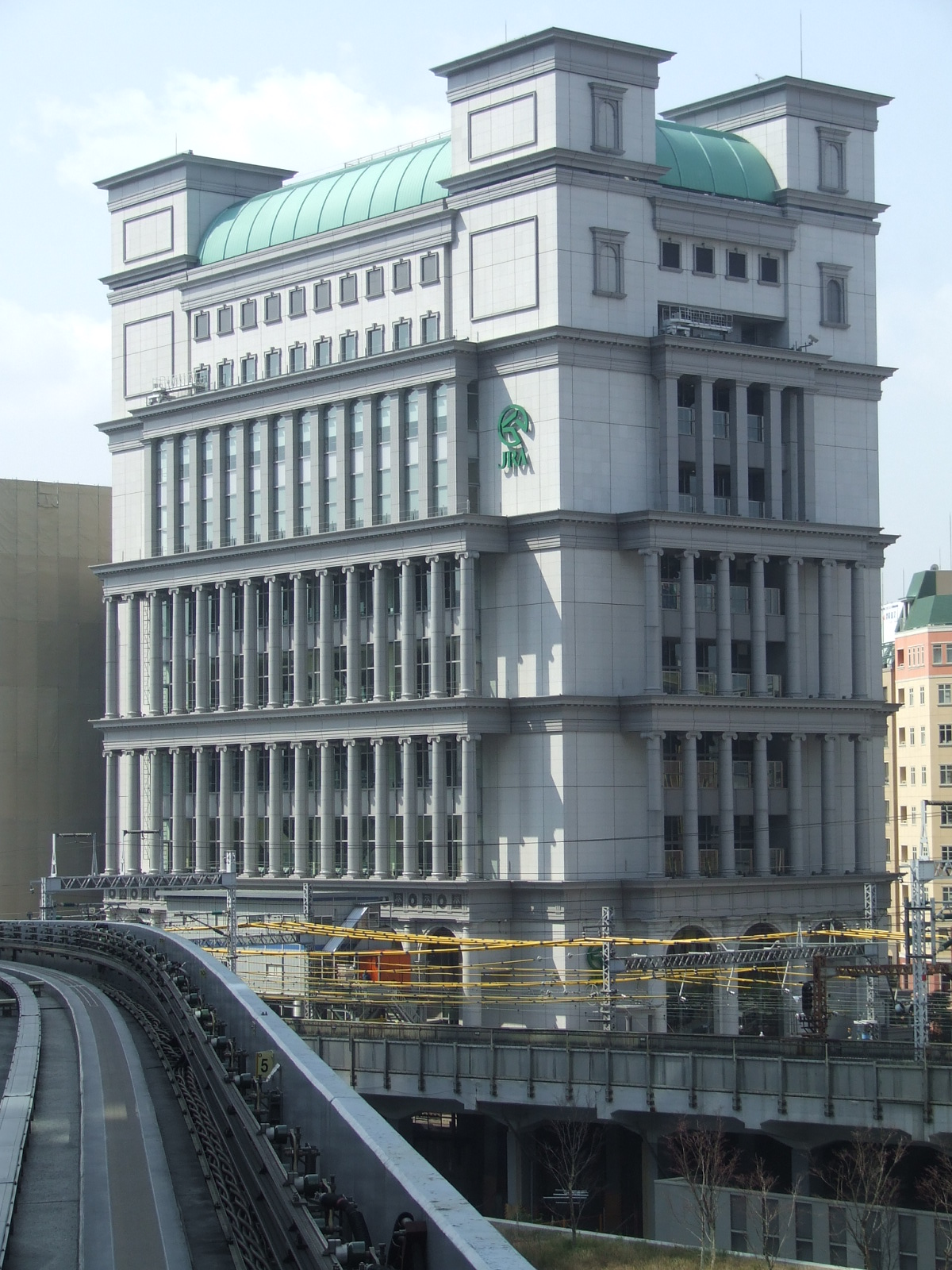
An off-track betting location in Shiodome, Tokyo; operated by the JRA

Off-track betting (or OTB; in British English, off-course betting) is sanctioned gambling on greyhound racing or horse racing outside a race track.

== U.S. history ==
Before the 1970s, only the state of Nevada allowed off-track betting. Off-track betting in New York was legalized in 1970, after years of unsuccessful attempts. By the 1970s there were 100 betting parlors in New York City, and twice that number by the late 1980s. In New York City, the thought was that legal off-track betting would increase revenue while at the same time decrease illegal gambling activity, but one effect of the legalization was a decrease of revenue at racetracks. The 1978 Interstate Horseracing Act struck a national compromise and stipulated that OTB revenues were to be shared with the racetracks, the horse owners, and the state. Another stipulation was that no OTB parlor was allowed to operate within 60 miles (97 km) of a track without its permission.

Revenues at the track indeed lessened, but rather than fight off-track betting, the industry sought to increase its income via new ways of gambling, betting on the OTB potential, and came up with "exotic wagers" such as exacta and trifecta. Thus the industry's revenue increased even as the number of spectators at the track went down.

In December 2010, the New York City OTB closed due to lack of profitability.

== Canada ==
After years of unsuccessful attempts and public anticipation in Canada, off-track betting (OTB) establishments (also known as 'Teletheatres') were finally legalized on the federal level, in Ottawa on June 29, 1989. Since then, the industry has flourished nationwide, with hundreds of off-track betting facilities across the country.

This industry is federally regulated by the Canadian Pari-Mutuel Agency (CPMA). The CPMA makes regulations in respect to pari-mutuel betting, and is responsible for ensuring the integrity and fairness of betting systems in Canada. Among the responsibilities of the CPMA include administering drug tests to horses to enforce the anti-drug policies.

=== Ontario ===
All off-track betting in Ontario is licensed by the Ontario Racing Commission (ORC) and is responsible for the integrity of the industry in the province. They are also responsible for distributing racing licenses, keeping a horse registry and running a problem gambling group.

To apply for a license the operator would need to purchase a permit from the ORC. If accepted, the site operator receives no profit from the betting exchanges—they make money from the increased traffic of customers and other creative methods. (i.e. cover charge, selling racing programs)

There are approximately 70 off-track betting facilities that have been licensed in Ontario. There are also a number of racetracks located in Ontario.

The Woodbine Entertainment Group is the most prominent organization, that owns a number of racetracks but also owns a number of off-track betting facilities across Canada.

== In the popular culture ==
- The 30th episode of Seinfeld features Kramer placing a $600 bet, 30-to-1 in a horse race at an Off-track betting parlor, after overhearing two men talking about a winning horse in the Subway. Kramer wins $18,000 in cash and is attacked later in the subway for the money.
- The 9th episode of season 2 of House opens with Dr. Gregory House placing a bet in an off-track betting parlor. While watching a race, a woman has a seizure and House notices strange bruising on her abdomen, leading him to take her on as a patient at the fictional Princeton–Plainsboro Teaching Hospital (PPTH).

== See also ==
- Totalisator
