= Northern Pipeline Agency =

Canadian government agency

The Northern Pipeline Agency (French: Administration du pipe-line du Nord) is a Government of Canada agency currently under the purview of Natural Resources Canada, and under the Department of Foreign Affairs and International Trade until 2004. The Agency was created in April 1978 with the proclamation of the Northern Pipeline Act to oversee the planning and construction of the Canadian section of the Alaska Highway Gas Pipeline Project by the Foothills Group of Companies, now owned by TransCanada Pipelines Ltd. (TCPL). Its mandate is stated as follows:

"The Agency's mandate is twofold. First, it carries out Government of Canada responsibilities in relation to the pipeline and facilitates the efficient and expeditious planning and construction of the pipeline, taking into account local and regional interests, in particular those of native people. Secondly, it maximizes the social and economic benefits from the construction and operation of the pipeline while at the same time minimizing any adverse effect on the social and environmental conditions of the areas most directly affected by the pipeline."

Further,

"The NPA acts as a single window between federal authorities and the Foothills Group of Companies, and between provincial and territorial governments, and the Government of the United States. In keeping with the Act, many regulatory powers of other Government of Canada departments and agencies related to the pipeline project are delegated to the NPA. This is not the case for those powers reserved exclusively to the National Energy Board or shared between the Board and the NPA."

The Agency oversaw the construction of the Prebuild from Caroline, Alberta to San Francisco and Chicago in the West and East respectively in the early 1980s but unfavourable economic conditions led to the suspension of Stage II (construction from the Alaska border near Beaver Creek, YT to the Alberta border near Boundary Lake, B.C.) as well as a corresponding reduction in resources and a prolonged period of inactivity. The Agency currently has a relatively small office, including the head Commissioner, the Deputy Minister of Natural Resources Canada Serge P. Dupont, who reports to Parliament through the Minister of Natural Resources, the Honourable Christian Paradis. The Agency Office develops and consults on major policy issues between the United States, the provinces, and the Government of Canada departments and agencies, concerned. An Assistant Commissioner was hired on a full-time basis in 2009, and several more staff have been hired since. The Act also provides for the appointment of an Administrator and Designated Officer within the National Energy Board (NEB), whose responsibilities are those relegated from the Commissioner. The Designated Officer is given responsibilities defined by the National Energy Board.
