= Canadian content value =

IRB Canadian content value (CCV) is the percentage of the selling price of a product or service which represents Canadian labour and materials and is potentially eligible as an offset against a Canadian Industrial Regional Benefits (IRB) obligation with the Government of Canada. Canadian content value is measured in Canadian dollars and is calculated by an IRB contractor.

== Calculating CCV ==
Industry Canada recommends two methods for calculating Canadian content value, depending on whether the selling price of the product or service can be substantiated: the net selling price method and the cost aggregate method.

=== Net Selling Price Method ===
If the selling price of a product or service can be substantiated, a Canadian Industrial Regional Benefits (IRB) contractor may use the net selling price method. This is calculated as the total selling price of the product minus any customs duties; excise taxes; GST, HST and all provincial sales taxes; and any costs associated with ineligible business activities, such as the value of goods imported into Canada.

=== Cost Aggregate Method ===
The cost aggregate method must be used if the selling price of a product or service cannot be substantiated. In this method, an IRB contractor aggregates the costs of parts and materials produced in Canada; Canadian transportation costs; Canadian labour costs; Canadian real estate costs; Canadian insurance costs; and several other eligible expenses.
