= Federal Mediation and Conciliation Service =

The Federal Mediation and Conciliation Service may refer:

- Federal Mediation and Conciliation Service (Canada)
- Federal Mediation and Conciliation Service (United States)
