= Office of Consumer Affairs =

An Office of Consumer Affairs most often refers to a government office dealing with matters of consumer protection.

In different jurisdictions, it may be referred to as a department, an office, a ministry or a more local title.

Examples are:

- California Department of Consumer Affairs
- Swedish Consumer Agency
- Federal Trade Commission Bureau of Consumer Protection (part of the US Commerce department)
- Federal Ministry for Food, Agriculture and Consumer Protection (Germany)
- Office of Consumer Affairs (Canada) - Industry Canada government agency
