= Canada Foundation for Sustainable Development Technology Act =

2001 Government of Canada statute

The Canada Foundation for Sustainable Development Technology Act (French: Loi sur la Fondation du Canada pour l'appui technologique au développement durable) is a Government of Canada statute to establish a foundation called Sustainable Development Technology Canada to fund sustainable development technology. The federal department responsible for enforcing this Act is Natural Resources Canada.

The Act was passed in 2001.
