= Polar 8 Project =

Cancelled icebreaker design

- Polar 8 design

Class overview
- Name: Polar 8
- Operators: Canadian Coast Guard
- Cost: Can$680 million
- Planned: 1
- Canceled: 1

General characteristics
- Type: Icebreaker - Polar class
- Displacement: 37,000 long tons (38,000 t)
- Propulsion: Diesel electric, 3 shafts, 107,000 shp (80,000 kW)
- Speed: 19 knots (35 km/h; 22 mph)
- Aircraft carried: 3 helicopters

The Polar 8 Project was a Canadian shipbuilding project intended to provide the Canadian Coast Guard with a large and heavy class icebreaker capable of operating year-round in the Northwest Passage. The project was developed as a means to assert Canada's sovereignty in the Arctic Ocean. It commenced in 1985 but was cancelled in 1990 while still in the final design stage. It was Canada's direct response to the unauthorized transit through the Northwest Passage in summer 1985 by USCGC Polar Sea, a United States Coast Guard icebreaker. Polar 8 refers the capability of the ship in ice of that thickness in feet, in this case 8 feet (2.4 m).

== Background ==
Canada's claims to their Arctic region and the Northwest Passage were challenged by the United States in 1969 and 1985. In 1969, the American oil tanker Manhattan traversed the entirety Northwest Passage with the help of Canadian and American icebreakers. The transit was difficult and in response, the Canadian government passed the Arctic Waters Pollution Prevention Act. In 1972, Canada had "ice-covered areas" added to the United Nations Convention on the Law of the Sea agreement, and in 1982, the agreement included exclusive economic zones, expanding Canada's control over their Arctic area. In 1985, controversy arose again after the United States Coast Guard icebreaker Polar Sea sailed around through the Northwest Passage without having asked permission from the Canadian government, which was required following the changes to the Law of the Sea agreement. This was further amplified by the inability of Canada's icebreaker CCGS John A. Macdonald to follow the American ship once the ice got too thick.

Studies into the construction of large icebreakers for Canada's north began in 1971. The Canadian Coast Guard initially tried to acquire two types of polar icebreaker, a Polar 7 and a Polar 10. The Polar 7 was to be of conventionally-powered design and the project was approved in the mid-1970s and German and Milne Ltd of Montreal, the largest naval architect firm in the country, were employed to design the ship. In 1976, the Canadian government asked German and Milne to design a Polar 10, nuclear-powered icebreaker. However, by March 1978, the required design had changed to a hybrid nuclear-conventionally powered vessel and in July 1979, proposals for the propulsion were received from the United States, United Kingdom, Germany and France. Due to various reasons, the nations pulled out, save for France by the following year.

The lack of competition for the hybrid-powered Polar 10 icebreaker design led the Canadian government to consider its alternatives. This led to the Polar 8 Project, a conventionally-powered large icebreaker. A conventionally-powered Polar 10 icebreaker design was rejected as being too costly to operate.

== Design and project initiation ==
Designed to be capable of year-round operations in the Arctic regions, the vessel was ordered based on the increased oil exploration activity in the Beaufort Sea and future Arctic oil and mineral exploration. The ship was also required to exert Canadian sovereignty in the Arctic area after Canada's claim to the area had been challenged by the United States. The ship was to have a planned displacement of 39,000 long tons (40,000 t) and powered by either a diesel electric or diesel direct engine driving three shafts, creating 107,000 shaft horsepower (80,000 kW). This would have given the vessel a maximum speed of 19 knots (35 km/h; 22 mph) at sea. The vessel was to be capable of uninterrupted progress in 2.4-metre (8 ft) pack ice and the steel that the ship was to be built from was to be tested down to −60 °C (−76 °F).

The ship's 875 long tons (889 t) of aviation fuel would have carried in tanks separated from the outer hull to minimize the chances of pollution. The vessel itself would have carried 13,000 long tons (13,000 t) of diesel fuel. The ship would have been equipped with laboratories, a moon pool and other deck equipment for scientific research. The ship would have been able to operate up to three helicopters. At the time, it would have been the world's largest icebreaker.

In September 1985, the Conservative Mulroney government chose the Polar 8 design for construction. The Department of National Defence had reservations about the project, claiming that the ship had no way to respond to northern submarine threats and that the cost of the vessel would exceed its estimated cost of $300–500 million. The competition to build the vessel was messy and the Mulroney government created a committee to sift through the proposals to find the best three.

== Construction and cancellation ==
The decision to award the construction contract was taken in 1987 when it was awarded to Versatile Pacific Shipyards Limited of North Vancouver, British Columbia. Soon after the project was awarded, Versatile Pacific Shipyards began having financing problems. The costs also began to rise, as Versatile claimed it had been too optimistic in its estimates. In May 1988, the design team asked for a further $70–80 million if the vessel was to keep its diesel-electric propulsion. The design was completed in 1988 and estimated costs had climbed over the budgeted amount.

This led the Canadian Coast Guard to ask the Versatile team to come up with a design based on a cheaper propulsion system. Before this could go any further, the Versatile Pacific Shipyards were put up for sale in December 1988. Funding for the project was reduced over the following years and on 19 February 1990, the program was officially cancelled, mainly due to rising costs, now pegged at $680 million. Following the Polar 8 Project cancellation, the Canadian Coast Guard funded the modernization overhaul and hull extension of the large icebreaker CCGS Louis S. St-Laurent in order to maintain a strategic presence in the Arctic Ocean. The Canadian Coast Guard also leased a former commercial icebreaker, Terry Fox, in 1992 as a stop-gap measure.

== See also ==
- Harry DeWolf-class offshore patrol vessel
- CCGS Arpatuuq and CCGS Imnaryuaq
