= C.D. Howe Building =

Building in Ottawa, Canada

Coordinates: 45°25′12″N 75°42′08″W

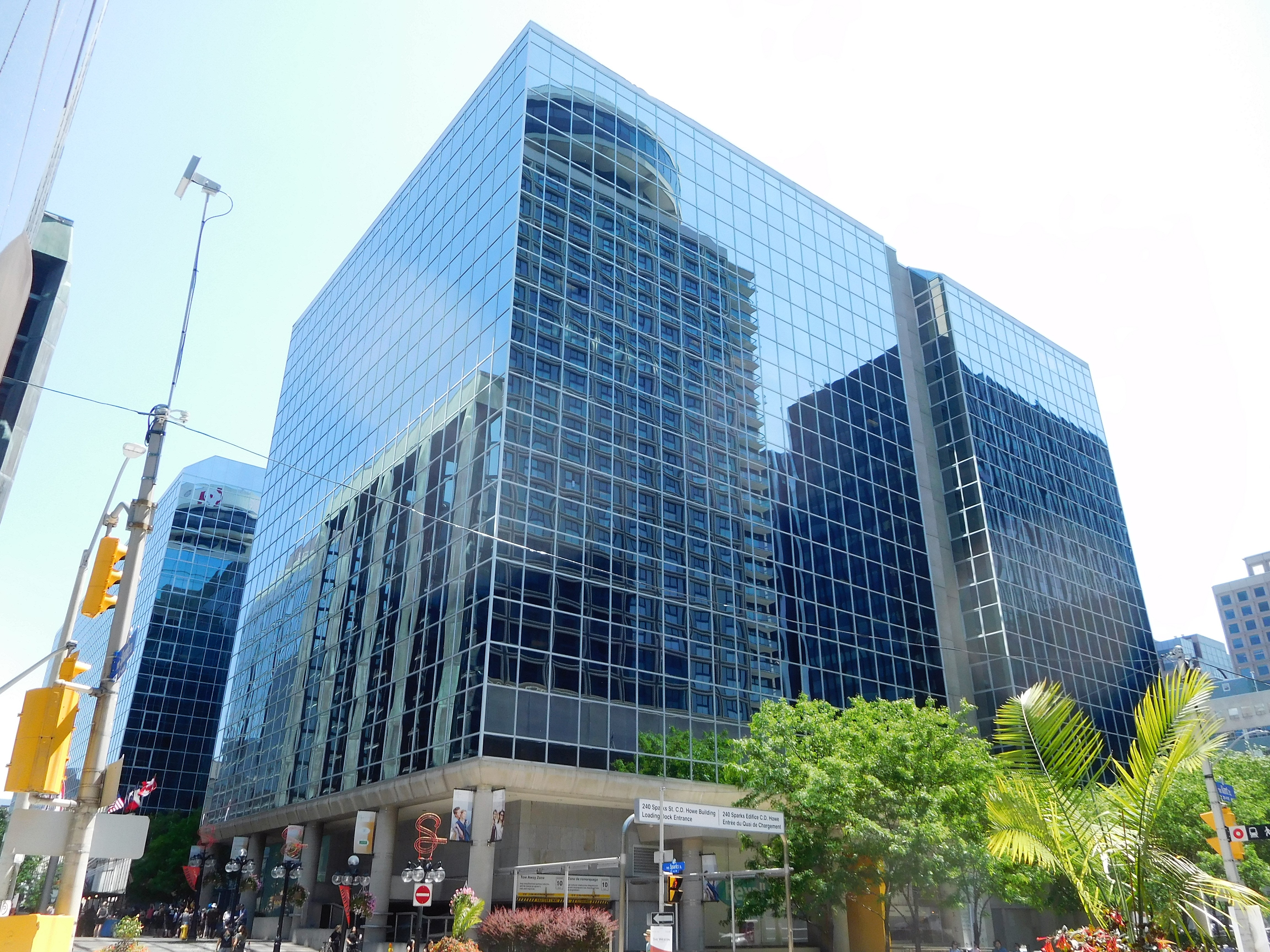
- C.D. Howe Building
- Interactive map of the C.D. Howe Building area

General information
- Type: office tower with retail space
- Architectural style: Postmodern
- Location: Ottawa, Ontario, Canada, 240 Sparks Street / 235 Queen Street
- Named for: C.D. Howe
- Completed: 1977-1978
- Opening: 1978
- Owner: Government of Canada (previously C.B. Richard Ellis)

Technical details
- Floor count: 11 (excluding 3 for retail below grade and parking garage)

Design and construction
- Architect: Adamson Associates
- Developer: Olympia and York

Other information
- Number of stores: 50

The C.D. Howe Building (French: Édifice C.D.-Howe) is an office tower in Ottawa, Ontario, Canada, that is the home of Innovation, Science and Economic Development Canada, the Office of the Auditor General and other smaller tenants. It was built by Olympia and York. The federal government sold the land to O&Y for a dollar and signed an agreement to lease the final building for a set rate until 2012. The eleven-story building was opened in 1978. The building site was once The Embassy Restaurant from 1953 to 1974.

== Description ==
It was named after C. D. Howe, a noted federal minister in the 1930s, 1940s and 1950s. It is located at the prominent intersection of Bank Street and Sparks Street. The lower levels of the building contain a shopping mall named 240 Sparks. The mall covers 3 floors with 50 stores including a Holt Renfrew store (closed 2015).

The most notable element of the building's interior is the amount of greenery and the large waterfall. Public Works and Government Services greened the rooftop to address environmental concerns including energy conservation, storm water management, biodiversity, and air quality, and to provide the occupants a landscaped tranquil outdoor space. More than 30% of the roof is landscaped and grows indigenous flowers, grasses and shrubs. Another 30% of the rooftop uses green roof technology. The C.D. Howe Building was included amongst other architecturally interesting and historically significant buildings in Doors Open Ottawa in both 2012 and 2014.

The two elevator banks contain two storey tall cars that rise in a large atrium that stretches the entire height of the building.

The C.D. Howe Building was recognized by the Building Owners and Managers Association (BOMA) as the "Government Office Building of the Year - Canada" in 1997/98 for excellence in management. The award was presented to the Property Manager, Ronald Vadeboncoeur RPA, FMA, CPM in Halifax, Nova Scotia. He accepted on behalf of his team, including key members: Sue Baxter, Barry O'Regan, Paul Anderson, Celine Maisonneuve, Pierre Boucher and Frank Donovan.

== Gallery ==
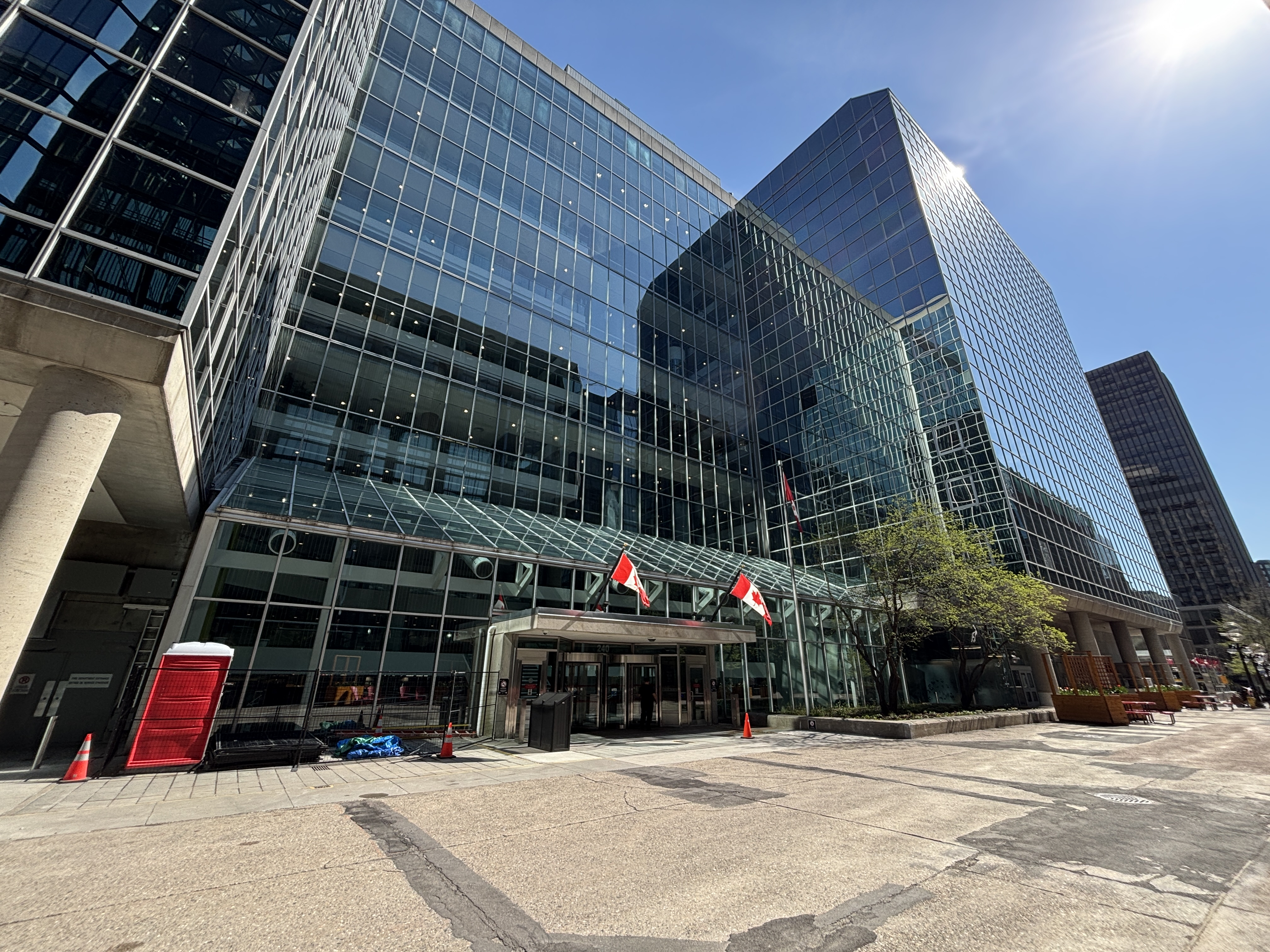
Building Entrance

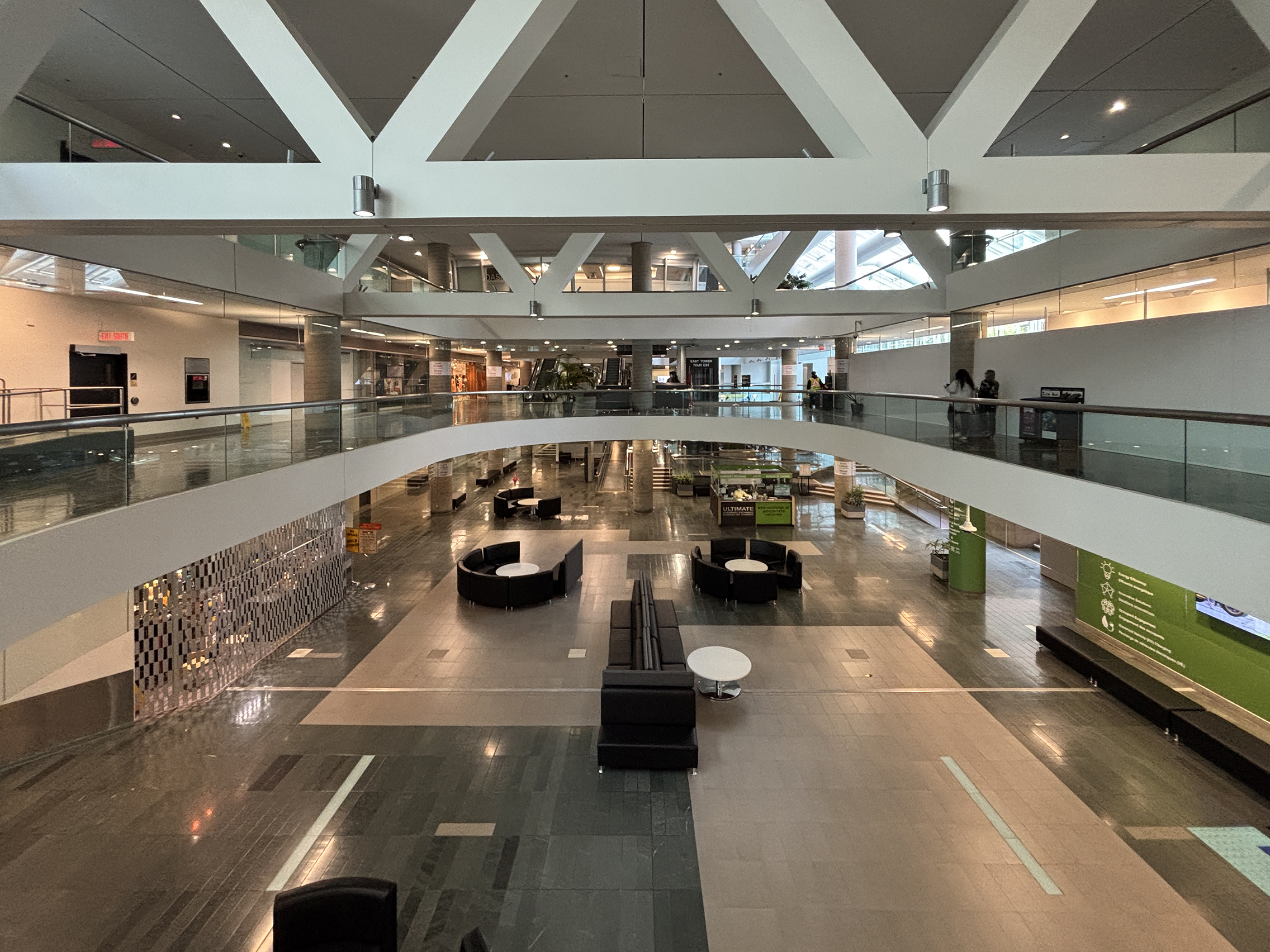
Interior of the building

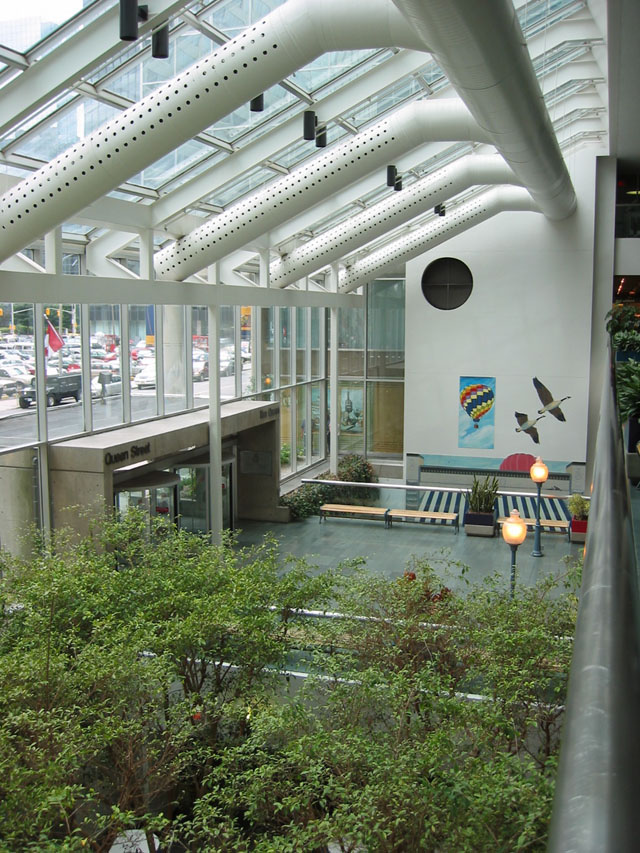
Indoors foyer
