= Special operating agency =

Canadian government organization classification

A special operating agency (SOA) is a designation given to a government organization within a department or agency of the Government of Canada, or a provincial government, that has some management flexibility, independence, and separate accountability. Federal SOAs function, without legislation, within a framework agreement approved by their given department's deputy minister, the minister responsible for the agency, and the Treasury Board. They are considered part of the host department and not separate legal entities.

Special operating agencies also exist among some provincial governments in Canada.

== Federal special operating agencies ==
Current
| Agency | Established as SOA | Parent department |
|---|---|---|
| Build Canada Homes | 2025 | Housing, Infrastructure and Communities Canada |
| Canadian Coast Guard | 2005 | National Defence |
| Canadian Conservation Institute | 1992 | Canadian Heritage |
| Canadian Forces Housing Agency | 1995 | National Defence |
| Canadian Heritage Information Network | 1992 | Canadian Heritage |
| Canadian Intellectual Property Office | 1992 | Innovation, Science and Economic Development |
| Canadian Pari-Mutuel Agency | 1993 | Agriculture and Agri-Food |
| CORCAN | 1992 | Public Safety (Correctional Service of Canada) |
| Defence Investment Agency | 2025 | Public Services and Procurement |
| Defence Research and Development Canada | 2000 | National Defence |
| Health Emergency Readiness Canada | 2024 | Innovation, Science and Economic Development |
| Indian Oil and Gas Canada (IOGC) | 1993 | Indigenous Services Canada |
| Major Projects Office | 2025 | Privy Council Office |
| Measurement Canada | 1996 | Innovation, Science and Economic Development |
| Office of the Superintendent of Bankruptcy | 1997 | Innovation, Science and Economic Development |
| Physical Resources Bureau | 1993 | Global Affairs |
| Translation Bureau | 1995 | Public Services and Procurement |

=== Former ===
The first 5 SOAs were created in December 1989 on a pilot basis:

- Canada Communication Group (Public Works and Government Services) (1989–1997)
- Consulting and Audit Canada (Public Works and Government Services) (1989–2013)
- Government Telecommunications Agency (GTA) (Communications) (1989–1994)
- Passport Canada (Foreign Affairs, Trade and Development) (1989–2013)
- Training and Development Canada (named Public Service Staff Training Program upon its inception) (Public Service Commission of Canada) (1989–2004)

Other were created later on and have since been dissolved:

- Canada Investment and Savings (named Canada Retail Debt Agency from 1995 to 1996) (Finance) (1995–2007)
- Canadian Grain Commission (Agriculture and Agri-Food) (1992–1999)
- Industrial Technologies Office (named Technology Partnerships Canada from 1996 to 2006) (Innovation, Science and Economic Development) (1996–2017)

== Provincial special operating agencies ==
Special operating agencies also exist among some provincial governments in Canada.

=== Manitoba ===
| Agency | Parent department | Notes |
|---|---|---|
| Entrepreneurship Manitoba | Public Service Delivery | |
| Materials Distribution Agency | Public Service Delivery | The mail and materials management services agency for the provincial government and government-funded organizations |
| Manitoba Education, Research and Learning Information Networks (MERLIN) | Public Service Delivery | Coordinates the delivery of technology services to the education community in Manitoba |
| Public Guardian and Trustee | Public Service Delivery | Manages and protects the affairs of those who are "unable to do so themselves and have no one else willing or able to act," including mentally incompetent and vulnerable adults, deceased estates, and children |
| Vehicle and Equipment Management Agency | Public Service Delivery | Fleet management organizations for public-sector organizations operating in Manitoba |
| Industrial Technology Centre (former) | Manitoba Business, Mining, Trade and Job Creation | |
| Office of the Fire Commissioner | | |
| Manitoba Financial Services Agency | Manitoba Finance | |
| Food Development Centre | Manitoba Agriculture | Fee-for-service agency created to "assist Manitoba's agrifood industry in the development and commercialization of food products." |
| Green Manitoba | Manitoba Environment and Climate Change | |
