= Service Canada Centres for Youth =

Previously the Human Resources & Career Centre for Students and the Hire-a-Student program, the Service Canada Centres for Youth (SCCY) were centres, set up by the Government of Canada as part of its Youth Employment Strategy, by which it helped students and employers across Canada with their summer employment needs. Due to declining attendance, the Federal Government permanently closed these centres in 2012.

In 1968, the first Hire-A-Student office was erected as a pilot project within a Canada Employment Centre (CECs) in Moose Jaw, Saskatchewan. The Federal Government supported the idea and in 1971, provided funds to establish Hire-A-Student offices in separate premises. The chief function, under supervision from the parent CEC, was to serve as a referral and placement service for students and employers. The philosophy behind the SCCY offices was peer group service: students helping students to find jobs. In 2008, the SCCYs celebrated the 40th anniversary of the program.

Summer jobs help students develop their skills, and offer them the work experience they need to build their career. SCCY provided a variety of free services to assist students improve their job search skills, and acquire meaningful employment. It also helped employers to find enthusiastic summer help. Most offices were open from May to August, and were staffed by experienced university students. The Ottawa, Winnipeg, London, and Windsor SCCY offices were open on a year-round basis.

== Student services ==
The SCCY offered the following no charge services:

- Student job postings
- Assistance in developing résumés and cover letters
- Helping with job interview techniques, through a mock interview
- Creative job search techniques
- Group information sessions
- Casual labour/odd job opportunities
- Volunteer experience opportunities
- Information on health and safety in the workplace
- Information on wage rates, Employment Standards, labour laws, and human rights
- Information on federal or provincial/territorial government programs and services

== Employer services ==
The SCCY provided the following services at no charge:

- Job-posting services
- Pre-screening of potential candidates
- Immediate access to enthusiastic students from all fields to help fill employment opportunities
- Flexible staffing options to suit individual business requirements (i.e. casual labour, long- or short-term employment)
- Posting services for volunteer opportunities
- Information on health and safety in the workplace
- Information on prevailing wage rates, employment standards and labour laws
- Labour market information
- Information on federal and provincial/territorial government programs and services
