= Canada Energy Regulator =

Canadian government agency

- Régie de l’énergie du Canada

Agency overview
- Formed: 2019
- Jurisdiction: Government of Canada
- Headquarters: Calgary, Alberta
- Employees: 571 (2022–2023))
- Annual budget: $112.4 million (2022–2023)
- Minister responsible: Tim Hodgson, Minister of Energy and Natural Resources
- Agency executive: Tracy Sletto, Chief Executive Officer
- Parent department: Natural Resources Canada
- Website: www.cer-rec.gc.ca/en/index.html

The Canada Energy Regulator (CER; French: Régie de l’énergie du Canada; REC) is the agency of the Government of Canada under its Natural Resources Canada portfolio, which licenses, supervises, regulates, and enforces all applicable Canadian laws as regards to interprovincial and international oil, gas, and electric utilities.

The CER is mandated to:

- make transparent decisions, orders, and recommendations with respect to pipelines, power lines, offshore renewable energy projects, and abandoned pipelines
- oversee the construction, operation, and abandonment of pipelines, interprovincial power lines, and international power lines
- make orders about traffic, tolls, and tariffs and overseeing matters relating to pipeline traffic, tolls, and tariffs
- make decisions and orders and give direction with respect to oil and gas interests, production, and conservation
- advise and report on energy matters
- provide alternative dispute resolution processes

Furthermore, the CER is mandated to exercise its powers and perform its duties and functions in a manner that respects the rights of the Indigenous peoples of Canada.

== History ==
The agency was established on August 28, 2019, under the provision of the Canadian Energy Regulator Act. The CER superseded the National Energy Board from which it took over regulatory responsibilities.

In August 2020, Gitane De Silva was appointed as CEO of the Canada Energy Regulator.

Pipelines originating from Alberta regulated by the CER
