= PMQ (military housing) =

Canadian military housing

A PMQ (Permanent Married Quarters or Private Married Quarters) is military housing located near Canadian military stations provided to families of Canadian Forces service personnel. Married quarters are now called Residential Housing Units (RHUs). Military housing is managed by the Canadian Forces Housing Agency (CFHA).

== Purpose and culture ==
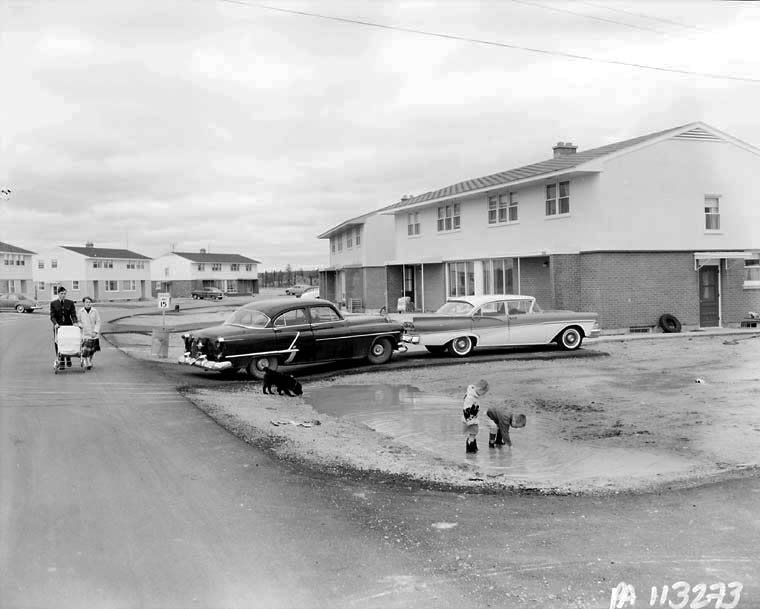
Married quarters at CFB Cold Lake, circa 1960

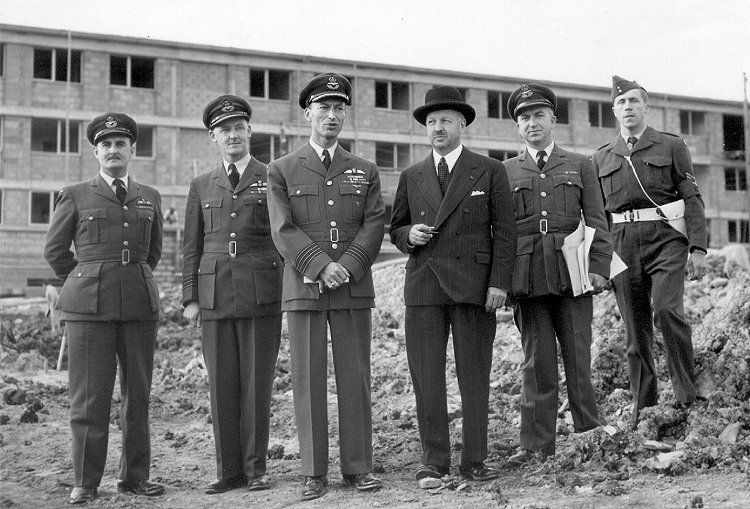
Married quarters under construction in Saint Avold, France. These apartments provided accommodation for families stationed in the 1950s and early 1960s at RCAF Station Grostenquin.

After the Second World War, service personnel returning to Canadian military stations, which were being expanded and modernized, needed accommodation for their families and so the Canadian government began providing housing. Military family housing neighborhoods often have churches, schools, banks, service stations, recreational facilities and stores.

PMQ housing, now called Residential Housing Units (RHUs), consists of apartments, row houses, duplex or detached houses. Family size and availability dictate what type of housing is allocated. Base housing is convenient because military members move frequently and so members do not have to be concerned with constantly selling and buying a house; members only need to pay rent and utilities. Living in PMQs/RHUs is also convenient since personnel are typically close to work.

The nature of the neighborhood is such that there is social support. Children of military personnel also have a bond because of what they have in common.

== Current status ==
Currently CFHA houses 17% of eligible CAF members in Residential Housing Units (RHUs). As of January 2020, CFHA had a net vacancy rate of 7%. At this time roughly 0.5% of units were held offline for disposal purposes, 1.5% for recapitalization projects, and 1% for betterment/lifecycle projects. Accommodation in the private sector is becoming popular because rents are competitive, and many service personnel prefer to buy so that they can develop equity in their homes. In general, PMQs/RHUs have undergone renovations since 1995 when the Canadian Forces Housing Agency began managing the units. Since most PMQs were built in the 1950s, many were built without basements or garages. The Canadian Forces Housing Agency has made several improvements to the portfolio.

In 2016, the federal auditor general found that the Department of National Defence (DND) is unaware of how many PMQs/RHUs it needs. The auditor general also found that rents have fallen to below-market levels for its 11,858 units (now 11,665 in 2019), which is unfair to those renting privately.

== See also ==
- Military brat
