= John Demco =

Canadian computer scientist and Internet pioneer

John C. Demco
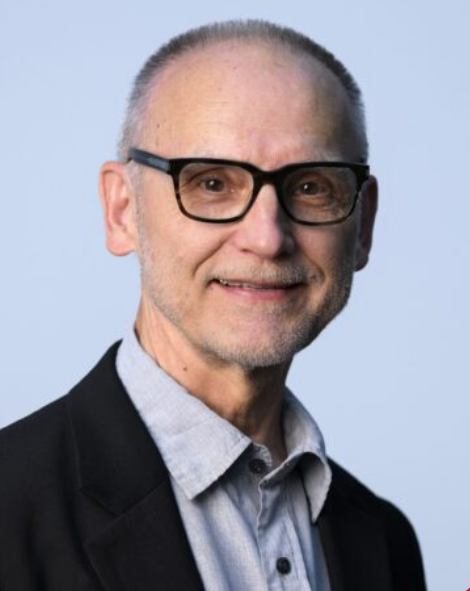
- Born: November 21, 1952; Vegreville, Alberta, Canada
- Citizenship: Canadian
- Education: University of Alberta, Master of Science (MSc)
- Known for: Founder of .CA domain, one of the founders of the Canadian internet
- Awards: Queen Elizabeth II Diamond Jubilee Medal (2013); recognized as a founder and builder of the Canadian Internet by then-Prime Minister Jean Chrétien (1997); Canadian Internet Hall of Fame (1997)
- Scientific career
- Fields: Computer science
- Institutions: University of British Columbia University of Alberta

John C. Demco (born November 21, 1952) is a Canadian computer scientist known for his role in establishing and administering the .CA internet country code top-level domain (ccTLD) for Canada. He is widely regarded as one of the founders of the Canadian internet.

Demco was allocated .CA from the Internet Assigned Numbers Authority (IANA) on May 14, 1987. He managed the .CA registry on a volunteer basis from 1987 until December 2000. He also participated in the Canadian Domain Name Consultative Committee, which recommended the establishment of a non-profit organization for the .CA domain, leading to the creation of Canadian Internet Registration Authority (CIRA) in December 1998. He served as a founding member of CIRA’s Board of Directors and still serves as a board advisor to the non-profit organization.

In 2000, he co-founded Canada's original domain registrar, Webnames.ca Inc.

== Career ==
John Demco began his career as a 22-year-old programmer analyst at his alma mater, the University of Alberta, where he produced pioneering hockey analytics reports for Golden Bears head coach Clare Drake, using a computer to tabulate hits, faceoffs, turnovers and shots (and the precise place on the ice where they occurred).

Demco became the manager of the Canadian academic and research network CDNnet in 1984, overseeing its growth and development. In 1986, he negotiated with phone companies and the U.S. government to secure a network connection between University of British Columbia (UBC) and the University of Washington (UW).

While working as a computing facilities manager at UBC, he petitioned for and secured .CA (the official country code top-level domain for Canada) from Jon Postel, an American computer scientist who administered the Internet Assigned Numbers Authority (IANA), on May 14, 1987, a couple years before the World Wide Web was invented.

In 1988, he helped establish an early Canadian connection to the internet, successfully linking up with the U.S. National Science Foundation’s network (NSFnet). Alongside similar efforts at the University of Toronto, McGill University and within the Canadian military, his connection was among the country’s first gateways to the emerging internet.

Demco registered the first eight .CA domain names on January 12, 1988, with the very first one claimed by the University of Prince Edward Island. He voluntarily managed the .CA registry until 2000, registering and recording more than 100,000 domain registrations before handing over responsibility to CIRA, a not-for-profit corporation he helped establish in 1998 with the government of Canada and UBC, which received $4.3M for this transfer of authority.

Following his retirement from UBC, where he worked from 1990 until 2007, the university renamed its undergraduate computing learning facility ‘The Demco Learning Centre' in 2008.

== Awards and recognition ==
Demco is an inductee into Canada’s Internet Hall of Fame and was recognized in 1997 by then Canadian Prime Minister Jean Chrétien as a founder and builder of the Canadian Internet. He also received a UBC Honorary Alumnus Award in 2014, a ‘Lifetime Achievement’ Canadian New Media Award in 2006 and the Queen Elizabeth II Diamond Jubilee Medal in 2013.
