= Natural Resources Canada =

Government department

- Ressources naturelles Canada

Department overview
- Formed: 1994
- Type: Department responsible for natural resources, energy, minerals and metals, forests, earth sciences, mapping and remote sensing
- Jurisdiction: Government of Canada
- Employees: 6,044 (2025)
- Annual budget: CA$4.4 billion (2024–25)
- Minister responsible: Tim Hodgson, Minister of Energy and Natural Resources
- Deputy Ministers responsible: Greg Orencsak, Deputy Minister; Jeff Labonté, Associate Deputy Minister
- Child agencies: Canada Energy Regulator; Canadian Forest Service; Geological Survey of Canada; Electricity Resources Branch; Energy Technology and Programs Sector; Innovation and Energy Technology Sector; Mineral and Metals Sector
- Website: natural-resources.canada.ca

Natural Resources Canada (NRCan; French: Ressources naturelles Canada; RNCan) (Note: Natural Resources Canada is the applied title under the Federal Identity Program; the legal title is Department of Natural Resources (French: Ministère des Ressources naturelles).) is the department of the Government of Canada responsible for natural resources, energy, minerals and metals, forests, earth sciences, mapping, and remote sensing. It was formed in 1994 by amalgamating the Department of Energy, Mines and Resources with the Department of Forestry.

Under the Constitution Act, 1867, primary responsibility for natural resources falls to provincial governments, however, the federal government has jurisdiction over off-shore resources, trade and commerce in natural resources, statistics, international relations, and boundaries. The department administers federal legislation relating to natural resources, including energy, forests, minerals and metals. The department also collaborates with American and Mexican government scientists, along with the Commission for Environmental Cooperation, to produce the North American Environmental Atlas, which is used to depict and track environmental issues for a continental perspective.

The current minister of natural resources is Tim Hodgson. The department is governed by the Resources and Technical Surveys Act and the Department of Natural Resources Act.

== Structure ==
The department currently has these sectors:

- Corporate Management and Services Sector
- Land and Minerals Sector
- Strategic Policy and Innovation Sector
- Low Carbon Energy Sector
- Energy Efficiency and Technology Sector
- Strategic Petroleum Policy and Investment Office
- Canadian Forest Service
- Indigenous Affairs and Reconciliation Sector
- Office of the Chief Scientist
- Major Projects Management Office
- Communications and Portfolio Sector
- Legal Services
- Audit and Evaluation Branch
- Geographical Names Board of Canada
- Space Weather Canada

The following sub-agencies are attached to the department:

- Canadian Forest Service
- Northern Pipeline Agency Canada
- Canada Energy Regulator
- Canadian Nuclear Safety Commission
- Atomic Energy of Canada Limited

== Related legislation ==
Acts for which Natural Resources Canada has responsibility

- Arctic Waters Pollution Prevention Act
- Canada Foundation for Sustainable Development Technology Act
- Canada Labour Code
- Canada Lands Surveyors Act
- Canada Lands Surveys Act
- Canada-Newfoundland Atlantic Accord Implementation Act
- Canada-Nova Scotia Offshore Petroleum Resources Accord Implementation Act
- Canada Oil and Gas Operations Act
- Canada Petroleum Resources Act
- Canadian Energy Regulator Act
- Canadian Ownership and Control Determination Act
- Cape Breton Development Corporation Act
- Cape Breton Development Corporation Divestiture Authorization and Dissolution Act
- Cooperative Energy Act
- Department of Natural Resources Act
- Energy Administration Act
- Energy Efficiency Act
- Energy Supplies Emergency Act
- Explosives Act
- Export and Import of Rough Diamonds Act
- Forestry Act
- Hibernia Development Project Act
- International Boundary Commission Act
- Northern Pipeline Act
- Nuclear Energy Act
- Nuclear Fuel Waste Act
- Nuclear Liability Act
- Nuclear Safety and Control Act
- Oil Substitution and Conservation Act
- Resources and Technical Surveys Act

=== Not in force ===
- Greenhouse Gas Technology Investment Fund Act

== See also ==
- EnerGuide for Houses
- Canada Green Building Council
- Minister of Energy and Natural Resources
- R-2000 program
