= Canada Digital Adoption Program =

Canadian government initiative

Canada Digital Adoption Program (CDAP) (French: Programme Canadien Adoption Numérique, PCAN) was a Canadian government initiative aimed at helping small and medium-sized businesses (SMBs) adopting digital technologies.

== History ==
The CA$4 billion CDAP initiative was first announced in 2021 Canadian federal budget, and subsequently launched in 2022 to help SMBs adopt digital technologies. It is administered by Innovation, Science and Economic Development Canada (ISED). It is based on the "Digital Main Street" concept, which was launched in 2014 by the City of Toronto in partnership with local Business Improvement Areas (BIAs).

CDAP provides eligible businesses with financial grants up to CA$ 15,000 and expert advice to support their digital transformation. Grants help cover the costs of developing and implementing a digital adoption plan (DAP), including purchasing new software and hiring digital consultants. Expert guidance assists businesses in selecting appropriate digital tools, hiring skilled talent, and navigating general digital transformation. Once the DAP is approved, the qualified businesses can apply for a no-interest loan of up to CA$100,000. To qualify, businesses must be for-profit SMBs with at least one employee, committed to digital adoption, and incorporated in Canada.

In February 2024, ISED stopped the program by calling it "fully subscribed".

== Limitations ==
Businesses faced a rigid application process and government-hosted marketplace, requiring them to navigate new accounts and platforms and choose from government-approved consultants. Each DAP had to follow a standard template, regardless of the business's size or type. Also, there was a shortage of consultants as applications closed early due to the pandemic. Many consultants aimed to provide services at the CA$15,000 maximum, but others were deterred by the program's limitations or missed the deadline. This left prospective clients with a limited selection of consultants, particularly those familiar with their sector.

On the other hand, it has been reported that the maximum subsidies of CA$15,000 grants to hire consultants led to a cottage industry of questionably credentialed advisers bombarding small-business owners with $15,000 plan offers. Some even proposed splitting the grant with owners, regardless of whether the plans were implemented.
