= Canadian Conservation Institute =

Special operating agency of the Department of Canadian Heritage

- Institut canadien de conservation

Agency overview
- Formed: 1972
- Type: Special operating agency
- Headquarters: Ottawa, ON
- Minister responsible: Marc Miller, Minister of Canadian Identity and Culture
- Agency executive: Jérôme Moisan, Director General, Heritage
- Parent department: Department of Canadian Heritage
- Website: official website

The Canadian Conservation Institute (CCI; French: Institut canadien de conservation) is a special operating agency of the federal Department of Canadian Heritage that provides research, information, and services regarding the conservation and preservation of cultural artifacts.

Materials and media it handles includes paper, textiles, metals, and glass, as well as electronic media, such as audio tape and compact discs. The CCI offices are located in the Ottawa suburb of Gloucester.

== Mission ==
The CCI is recognized as a pioneer and leader in the conservation of cultural heritage in Canada. The CCI supports the heritage community in preserving Canada's heritage collections so they can be accessed by current and future generations. The CCI is charged with the duty "to promote the proper care and preservation of Canada's moveable cultural heritage, and to advance the practice, science, and technology of conservation."

== History ==
The CCI originated within the National Gallery of Canada in 1957, as its Conservation and Scientific Research Division under the leadership of Dr. Nathan Stolow. In 1964, the division was granted greater autonomy and became the National Conservation Research Laboratory ("NCRL"). As a result of its success, in 1972 the NCRL was split off from the National Gallery of Canada and was renamed the Canadian Conservation Institute with Dr. Stolow as its first Director General. It now operates as an agency of the federal government of Canada, currently under the auspices of the Department of Canadian Heritage.

The CCI is primarily a research organization, but provides education and services on conservation and restoration-related matters. The CCI now promotes the proper care and preservation of Canada's cultural heritage and to advance the practice, science, and technology of conservation. The institute has worked closely with hundreds of Canadian museums, art galleries, archives, libraries, historic sites, academic institutions, and other heritage organizations to help them better preserve their collections. The primary role of CCI's clients is to acquire, conserve, research, communicate, and exhibit permanent heritage collections that are accessible to the Canadian public for purposes of study, education, and enjoyment. As a Special Operating Agency of the Department of Canadian Heritage, CCI has widened its scope of activities and now markets its services and products around the world. The CCI was included amongst other architecturally interesting and historically significant buildings in Doors Open Ottawa, held June 2, 2012.

== Programs ==
The following are but some of the services CCI provides:

- Conservation research and laboratory services.
- Preventative and restorative conservation.
- Transportation of artifacts.
- Scientific examination and analysis of museum objects and archaeological materials.
- Advice on preserving a historic house or property.
- Collections assessment surveys.
- Advice for conservation or restoration treatment for valuable works of art.
- Conservation and restoration training.

CCI also provides project-specific teams for conservation, scientific, and testing projects. Its Paper Group works with archives and libraries in preserving and restoring their collections. Research conducted by the Paper Group includes paper bleaching, enzyme use, washing, and de-acidification. The CCI also self-publishes a variety of materials related to its work. As well, each year it publishes the CCI, the Journal of the Canadian Conservation Institute. With a staff of about 80 to 100, the CCI has treated more than 13,000 objects for the heritage community, has published hundreds of scientific papers, and has distributed in excess of one million publications. The institute responds to at least 2,000 requests for assistance annually. Working together in well-equipped, fully secure, climate-controlled laboratories, conservators, chemists, engineers, biologists, and other professionals handle projects ranging from information inquiries to complex treatments and research.
