= Arctic Waters Pollution Prevention Act =

Canadian law

Parliament of Canada
- Long title: An Act to prevent pollution of areas of the arctic waters adjacent to the mainland and islands of the Canadian arctic
- Citation: R.S.C., 1985, c. A-12

The Arctic Waters Pollution Prevention Act (French: Loi sur la prévention de la pollution des eaux arctiques, 1970, R.S.C. 1985) is a Government of Canada statute to prevent pollution of areas of the arctic waters adjacent to the mainland and islands of the Canadian arctic. The Government of Canada departments responsible for enforcing the Act are Natural Resources Canada, Transport Canada, Crown–Indigenous Relations and Northern Affairs Canada.
