= Federal Mediation and Conciliation Service (Canada) =

The Federal Mediation and Conciliation Service (FMCS) is a Canadian government service under the Department of Human Resources and Skills Development Canada.

FMCS is responsible for providing dispute resolution and dispute prevention assistance to trade unions and employers under the federal jurisdiction of the Canada Labour Code. FMCS provides conciliation and mediation assistance to parties engaged in collective bargaining and offers an extensive range of preventive mediation and grievance mediation services aimed at resolving differences and improving industrial relations during the closed period of a collective agreement.
