= Canada School of Public Service =

Educational institution for the Government of Canada

Coordinates: 45.4301052°N 75.6972469°W

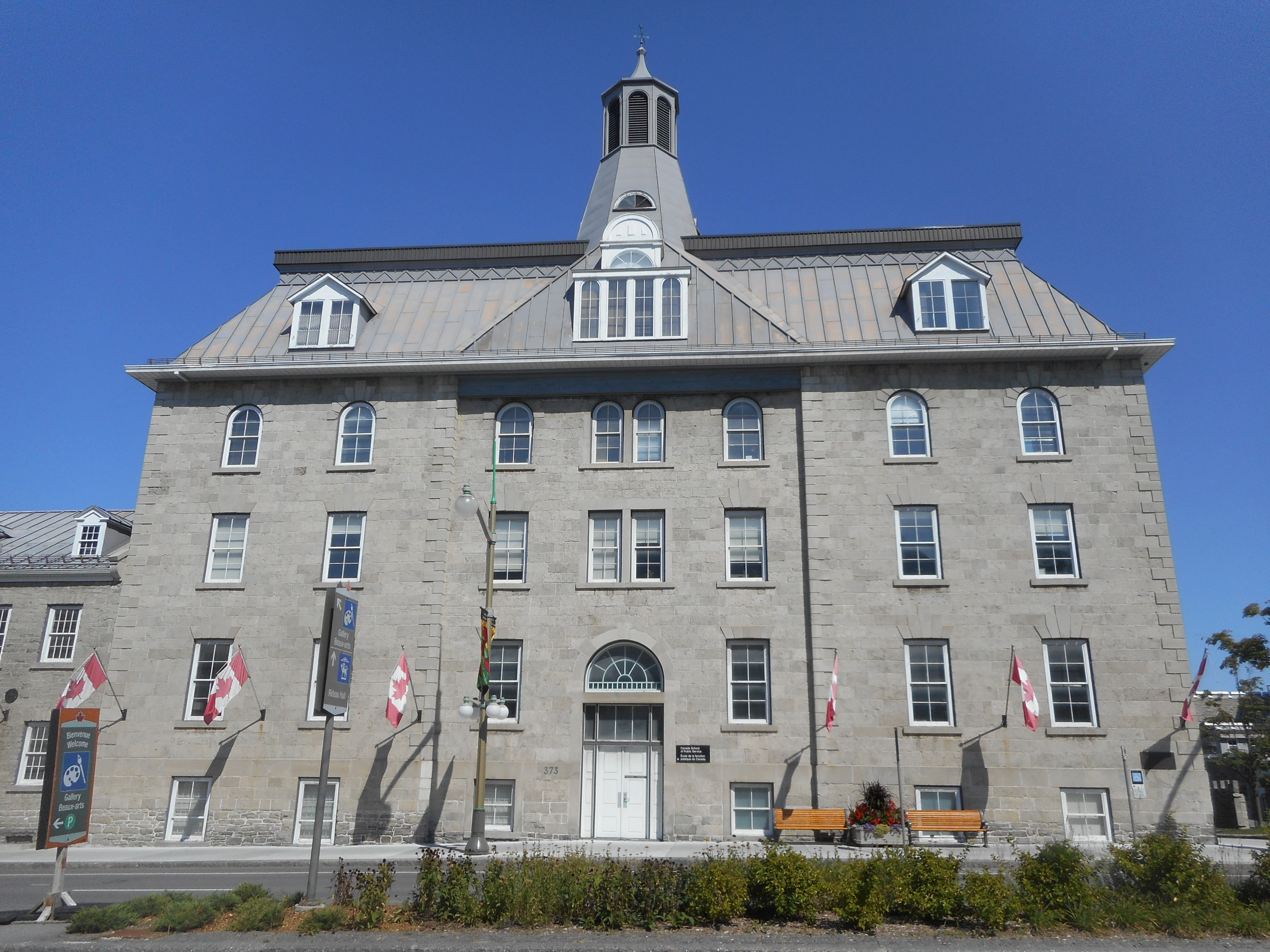
373 Sussex Drive, Ottawa

The Canada School of Public Service was created on April 1, 2004. The School is the main educational institution for the Government of Canada, and is part of the Treasury Board portfolio. It was created from an amalgamation of the following three organizations: the Canadian Centre for Management Development, Training and Development Canada and Language Training Canada.

== Mission ==
The School's primary responsibility is to provide a broad range of learning opportunities and establish a culture of learning within the public service. The School is a departmental corporation whose mission is set out in the Canada School of Public Service Act.

== Governance and organizational structure ==
The School is headed by a Deputy Minister/President (currently Taki Sarantakis) who has supervision over and direction of the work and staff of the School. The School reports to the President of the Treasury Board. The work of the School is carried out by their branches and regional offices under the leadership of the Deputy Minister/President.

- The Deputy Minister/President's Office is responsible for setting the direction of the School's policies and programs and ensuring that the organization meets the learning needs of public servants across Canada.
- The Learning Programs Branch is the delivery arm for all learning programs and services offered by the School across Canada. The Branch is responsible for the design, development and delivery of the School's curriculum to all public servants.
- The Corporate Services Branch is responsible for corporate management services in the areas of finance, administration, information technology and human resources. The Vice-President serves as the School's Chief Financial Officer (CFO).
- The Strategic Directions and Service Excellence Branch provides corporate leadership and direction for the School's agenda and business development and develops integrated marketing, communications approaches. Roles include planning, policy, evaluation, client relations and service excellence.

== Arms ==
Coat of arms of Canada School of Public Service
Notes Granted 15 June 2004. Crest Issuant from a circlet of maple leaves Gules alternating with fleurs-de-lis Argent a demi lion Or holding between its paws an open book Argent edged Or bound Gules. Escutcheon Lozengy Gules and Argent a lozenge Argent charged with a maple leaf Gules. Motto Tradition Excellence
