= Canadian Forces Housing Agency =

Organization that manages military housing

The Canadian Forces Housing Agency is a special operating agency that manages military housing on behalf of the Canadian Department of National Defence for members of the Canadian Armed Forces and their families located on wings and bases.

Established in October 1995, it operates and maintains 11,665 military family housing units across Canada. The organization is headed by a chief executive officer.

== Housing units ==
The housing units are located in:

- 3 Wing Bagotville
- CFB Borden
- 4 Wing Cold Lake
- 19 Wing Comox
- 17 Wing Det Dundurn
- CFB Edmonton
- CFB Esquimalt
- CFB Gagetown
- CFB Gander
- 5 Wing Goose Bay
- 14 Wing Greenwood
- CFB Halifax
- JTFN Det NU Iqaluit
- CFB Kingston
- CFS Det Masset
- CFB Montreal
- CFB Moose Jaw
- CFB North Bay
- CFSU
- 4 CDSB Petawawa
- CFB Shilo
- CFB Suffield
- 8 Wing Trenton
- CFB Valcartier
- CFB Wainwright
- CFB Winnipeg
- JTFN HQ Yellowknife
