= Office of Consumer Affairs (Canada) =

Canadian government agency

The Office of Consumer Affairs (OCA; French: Bureau de la consommation) is a Government of Canada agency under Innovation, Science and Economic Development Canada, which is responsible for consumer protection and promotion. The OCA is mandated "to these responsibilities by building trust in the marketplace so that consumers can both protect themselves and be able to confidently and knowledgeably drive demand for innovative products and services at competitive prices".
