= Canadian Pari-Mutuel Agency =

Canadian horse racing regulator

The Canadian Pari-Mutuel Agency is a special operating agency of Agriculture and Agri-Food Canada that regulates and supervises pari-mutuel betting on horse racing at racetracks across Canada, to ensure that pari-mutuel betting is done in a fair way to benefit the public. The Agency is funded through the collection of a levy of 0.8% on each bet on horse races placed in Canada.
