= Innovation, Science and Economic Development Canada =

Government department of Canada

- Innovation, Sciences et Développement économique Canada

Department overview
- Formed: 1892 (as Department of Trade and Commerce); 1993 (as Industry Canada); 2015 (as Innovation, Science and Economic Development Canada)
- Type: Department responsible for: economic development and innovation; market regulation and competition; research and development; intellectual property and copyright administration and arbitration; and more
- Jurisdiction: Canada
- Headquarters: C.D. Howe Building, 235 Queen Street, Ottawa, ON
- Employees: 6,281 (2022–23)
- Annual budget: C$ 4.9 billion (2015)
- Ministers responsible: Mélanie Joly, Minister of Industry; Evan Solomon, Minister of Artificial Intelligence and Digital Innovation; Rechie Valdez, Minister for Women and Gender Equality and Secretary of State (Small Business and Tourism; Buckley Belanger, Secretary of State (Rural Development)
- Deputy Ministers responsible: Philip Jennings, Deputy Minister of Innovation, Science and Economic Development; Sony Perron, Deputy Minister of Economic Development and Deputy Minister/President of Canada Economic Development for Quebec Regions; Francis Bilodeau, Associate Deputy Minister of Innovation, Science and Economic Development
- Child agencies: Business Development Bank of Canada; Canadian Space Agency; Competition Bureau; Destination Canada; Competition Tribunal; Regional Economic Development agencies; Statistics Canada; National, Social Sciences & Humanities, and Natural Sciences & Engineering Research Councils
- Key document: Department of Industry Act, S.C. 1995, c. 1
- Website: http://www.ic.gc.ca https://ised-isde.canada.ca/

Innovation, Science and Economic Development Canada (ISED; French: Innovation, Sciences et Développement économique Canada; ISDE) (Note: Innovation, Science and Economic Development Canada is the applied title under the Federal Identity Program; the legal title is Department of Industry (French: Ministère de l’Industrie).) is a department of the Government of Canada responsible for a number of the federal government's functions in regulating industry and commerce, promoting science and innovation, and supporting economic development. The department was known as Industry Canada (IC) prior to 2015.

The department is led by the Minister of Industry (currently Mélanie Joly), who also serves as the Minister responsible for Canada Economic Development for Quebec Regions. Several other ministerial portfolios are associated with the department. While the minister is head of the department, and provides policy/political direction, the day-to-day operations of the department are managed by the deputy minister, who is a public servant. The department headquarters are located at the C.D. Howe Building at 235 Queen Street in Ottawa, Ontario.

== History ==
The Department of Trade and Commerce was created in statute on 23 June 1887 and proclaimed into force on 3 December 1892. In 1969, the department was replaced by the Department of Industry, Trade and Commerce, which itself was replaced in 1990 by Industry, Science and Technology. This new department also absorbed the offices of Minister of Regional Industrial Expansion and Minister of State for Science and Technology, marking the inclusion of regional approaches and scientific emphasis in the development of Canadian industries. In 1993, the department expanded its portfolio further to include Consumer and Corporate Affairs. In March 1995, the department was renamed Industry Canada.

Upon the November 2015 installation of the 29th Canadian Ministry led by Prime Minister Justin Trudeau, the position Minister of Industry was renamed Minister of Innovation, Science, and Economic Development. Subsequently, applied title under the Federal Identity Program was changed from Industry Canada to Innovation, Science and Economic Development Canada.

In May 2025, following the installation of the 30th Canadian Ministry led by Prime Minister Mark Carney, the Ministerial title responsible for the ISED portfolio was reverted back to Minister of Industry. In addition, the Carney administration brought major reforms to the federal cabinet, including a historically smaller cabinet and the establishment, for the first-time in Canadian history, of a minister responsible for artificial intelligence and digital innovation.

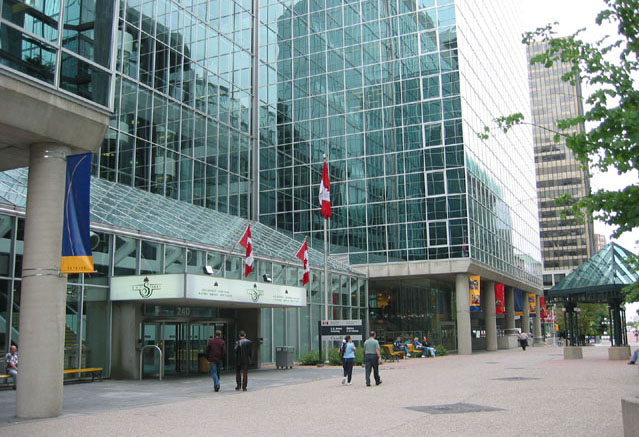
The C.D. Howe Building, home to many Industry Canada offices

== Officials and structure ==
The department at large is headed by the Minister of Industry, Mélanie Joly.

Four portfolios of ISED are designated to other ministers, however:

- Minister of Artificial Intelligence and Digital Innovation and Minister responsible for the Federal Economic Development Agency for Southern Ontario
- Minister of Women and Gender Equality and Secretary of State (Small Business and Tourism)
- Secretary of State (Rural Development)

== Portfolio ==
ISED oversees 17 departments and agencies and is associated with an additional 4 organizations. Each of these organizations are related to one or more of the four focus areas of ISED: innovation in science and technology, trade and investment, growing small and medium-sized enterprises, and economic growth of Canadian communities.

Measurement Canada and the Canadian Intellectual Property Office are special operating agencies of ISED. Communications Research Centre Canada is a research institute that provides technical advice and support to ISED's Spectrum and Telecommunications Sector,

In addition to Innovation, Science and Economic Development Canada, the ministerial portfolio includes:

- Business Development Bank of Canada (BDC)
- Canadian Intellectual Property Office (CIPO)
- Canadian Space Agency (CSA)
- Communications Research Centre Canada (CRC)
- Competition Bureau Canada (COBU)
- Competition Tribunal
- Copyright Board of Canada (CB)
- Destination Canada (formerly the Canadian Tourism Commission)
- Measurement Canada (MC)
- National Research Council of Canada (NRC)
- Natural Sciences and Engineering Research Council (NSERC)
- Office of Consumer Affairs (OCA)
- Office of the Superintendent of Bankruptcy (OSB)
- Social Sciences and Humanities Research Council of Canada (SSHRC)
- Standards Council of Canada (SCC)
- Statistics Canada (StatCan)

Although they are not part of the ministerial portfolio, the following organizations are also associated with ISED:

- Canada Foundation for Innovation (CFI)
- Council of Canadian Academies (CCA)
- Genome Canada
- Pierre Elliott Trudeau Foundation

== Related legislation ==
The departmental legislation for ISED is the Department of Industry Act, which states that the minister's objective is to use their role in order to "strengthen the national economy and promote sustainable development." The Act also outlines a number of supporting objectives. The minister must also use their position to support domestic trade and support a healthy marketplace through investment and technology.

As of 2021, ISED is responsible for various legislation, especially those related to economic development, including:

- Departmental legislation:
  - Department of Industry Act, S.C. 1995, c. 1
- Telecommunications legislation:
  - Radiocommunication Act, R.S.C. 1985, c. R-2
  - Telecommunications Act, S.C. 1993, c. 38
- Marketplace and trade legislation:
  - Agreement on Internal Trade Implementation Act, S.C. 1996, c. 17
  - Bankruptcy and Insolvency Act, R.S.C. 1985, c. B-3
  - Boards of Trade Act, R.S.C. 1985, c. B-6
  - Canada Business Corporations Act, R.S.C. 1985, c. C-44
  - Canada Cooperatives Act, S.C. 1998, c. 1
  - Canada Corporations Act, R.S.C. 1970, c. C-32
  - Canada Not-for-profit Corporations Act, S.C. 2009, c. 23
  - Canada Small Business Financing Act, S.C. 1998, c. 36
  - Companies' Creditors Arrangement Act, R.S.C. 1985, c. C-36
  - Competition Act, R.S.C. 1985, c. C-34
  - Government Corporations Operation Act, R.S.C. 1985, c. G-4
  - Investment Canada Act, R.S.C. 1985, c. 28 (1st Supp.) (except Parts II–V1, but not Part IV.1)
  - Winding-up and Restructuring Act, R.S.C. 1985, c. W-11 (Part I)
- Intellectual property legislation:
  - Copyright Act, R.S.C. 1985, c. C-42
  - Industrial Design Act, R.S.C. 1985, c. I-9
  - Integrated Circuit Topography Act, S.C. 1990, c. 37
  - Olympic and Paralympic Marks Act, S.C. 2007, c. 25
  - Patent Act, R.S.C. 1985, c. P-4 (except sections 79–103)
  - Public Servants Inventions Act, R.S.C. 1985, c. P-32
  - Trade-marks Act, R.S.C. 1985, c. T-13
- Consumer legislation:
  - Bills of Exchange Act, R.S.C. 1985, c. B-4 (Part V)
  - Consumer Packaging and Labelling Act, R.S.C. 1985, c. C-38 (except in relation to food)
  - Electricity and Gas Inspection Act, R.S.C. 1985, c. E-4
  - Personal Information Protection and Electronic Documents Act, S.C. 2000, c-5
  - Precious Metals Marking Act, R.S.C. 1985, c. P-19
  - Textile Labelling Act, R.S.C. 1985, c. T-10
  - Timber Marking Act, R.S.C. 1985, c. T-11
  - Weights and Measures Act, R.S.C. 1985, c. W-6
- Registrar General functions
  - Public Documents Act, R.S.C. 1985, c. P-28
  - Public Officers Act, R.S.C. 1985, c. P-31
  - Seals Act, R.S.C. 1985, c. S-6
  - Trade Unions Act, R.S.C. 1985, c. T-14
- Portfolio and agency legislation:
  - Business Development Bank of Canada Act, S.C. 1995, c. 28
  - Budget Implementation Act, 1997, S.C. 1997, c. 26 (Part I: Canada Foundation for Innovation)
  - Canadian Space Agency Act, S.C. 1990, c. 13
  - Canadian Tourism Commission Act, S.C. 2000, c. 28
  - Civil International Space Station Agreement Implementation Act, S.C. 1999, c. 35
  - Competition Tribunal Act, R.S.C. 1985, c. 19 (2nd Supp.)
  - National Research Council Act, R.S.C. 1985, c. N-15
  - Natural Sciences and Engineering Research Council Act, R.S.C. 1985, c. N-21
  - Social Sciences and Humanities Research Council Act, R.S.C. 1985, c. S-12
  - Standards Council of Canada Act, R.S.C. 1985, c. S-16
  - Statistics Act, R.S.C. 1985, c. S-19
- Other legislation:
  - Agricultural and Rural Development Act, R.S.C. 1985, c. A-3
  - Atlantic Canada Opportunities Agency Act, R.S.C. 1985, c. 41 (4th Supp.)
  - Atlantic Fisheries Restructuring Act, R.S.C. 1985, c. A-14 (in respect of certain companies)
  - Bell Canada Act, S.C. 1987, c. 19
  - Corporations Returns Act, R.S.C. 1985, c. C-43
  - Employment Support Act, S.C. 1970-71-72, c. 56
  - Industrial and Regional Development Act, R.S.C. 1985, c. I-8 (except in relation to certain provinces)
  - Pension Fund Societies Act, R.S.C. 1985, c. P-8
  - Regional Development Incentives Act, R.S.C. 1970, c. R-38)
  - Small Business Investment Grants Act, S.C. 1980-81-82-83, c. 147
  - Special Areas Act, R.S.C. 1985, c. S-14 (Ontario)

== Certifications and approvals ==
- Technical Acceptance Certificate (TAC) for Category I radio and broadcasting equipment.

== See also ==
- Canada Digital Adoption Program
- Canadian content value
- List of telecommunications regulatory bodies
