= Canada Agricultural Review Tribunal =

Canadian regulatory appellate tribunal

The Canada Agricultural Review Tribunal is a Canadian regulatory appellate tribunal, which reviews administrative monetary penalty cases relating to agriculture and agri-food.

== History ==
The Canada Agricultural Review Tribunal is an independent, quasi-judicial regulatory appellate tribunal, established in 1983 by the Parliament of Canada, through section 4.1 of the Canada Agricultural Products Act. The tribunal acts to "balance the rights of Canadians with the protection of health and well-being of Canadian consumers and the economic vibrancy of Canadian agriculture and agri-food industries." It provides oversight of federal agencies' use of penalties set out in the Agriculture and Agri-food Administrative Monetary Penalties Act. Members of the public may seek a review of certain Agriculture and Agri-food violations before the Tribunal.

The tribunal has the jurisdiction to hear, either orally or by written submissions only, cases involving agriculture, food and animal handling and transportation. It hears cases brought by persons who have been issued notices of violation for bringing animal or plant products into the country without permission or where a producer, transporter or handler of animals or plants in Canada fails to meet set standards for transport, including animal welfare, animal identification and disease prevention. Tribunal decisions have been cited and commented on by various Canadian animal welfare organizations throughout Canada, as well as in legal commentary.

Upon receipt of a request for review by an alleged violator, with reasons specified, the tribunal currently reviews notices of violation issued by the Canada Border Services Agency, Canadian Food Inspection Agency and the Pest Management Regulatory Agency. It also reviews certain decisions of the Minister of Health and the Minister of Agriculture and Agri-Food. The tribunal offices are located in Ottawa, Canada. However, there are currently 96 locations in which tribunal hearings are authorized to take place across Canada. There is at least one location in each province and territory of Canada.

Decisions of the Canada Agricultural Review Tribunal are reviewable by the Federal Court of Appeal.
