= Government of Canada =

His Majesty's Government
- Gouvernement de Sa Majesté
- Federal government
- Official wordmark

Overview
- Established: July 1, 1867
- Country: Canada
- Leader: Prime Minister (Mark Carney)
- Appointed by: Governor General (Louise Arbour)
- Main organ: Cabinet of Canada
- Responsible to: House of Commons
- Headquarters: Ottawa, Ontario
- Website: www.canada.ca

The Government of Canada (French: gouvernement du Canada), formally His Majesty's Government (Gouvernement de Sa Majesté), is the federal executive of Canada, which includes ministers of the Crown (organized as the Cabinet) and the federal civil service (whom the Cabinet direct); it is corporately branded as the Government of Canada. There are over 103 departments and agencies, as well as over 300,000 persons employed in the Government of Canada. These institutions carry out the programs and enforce the laws established by the Parliament of Canada.

The federal government's organization and structure was established at Confederation, through the Constitution Act, 1867, wherein the Canadian Crown acts as the core, or "the most basic building block", of its Westminster-style parliamentary democracy. The monarch, King Charles III is head of state and is personally represented by a governor general (currently Louise Arbour). The prime minister (currently Mark Carney) is the head of government, who is invited by the Crown to form a government after securing the confidence of the House of Commons, which is typically determined through the election of enough members of a single political party in a federal election to provide a majority of seats in Parliament, forming a governing party. Further elements of governance are outlined in the rest of the Canadian constitution, which includes written statutes in addition to court rulings and unwritten conventions developed over centuries.

Constitutionally, the King's Privy Council for Canada is the body that advises the sovereign or their representative on the exercise of executive power. This task is carried out nearly exclusively by the Cabinet, which functions as the executive committee of the Privy Council that sets the government's policies and priorities for the country and is chaired by the prime minister. The sovereign appoints the members of Cabinet on the advice of the prime minister who, by convention, are generally selected primarily from the House of Commons (although often include a limited number of members from the Senate). During its term, the government must retain the confidence of the House of Commons and certain important motions, such as money bills and the speech from the throne, are considered as confidence motions. Laws are formed by the passage of bills through Parliament, which are either sponsored by the government or individual members of Parliament. Once a bill has been approved by both the House of Commons and the Senate, royal assent is required to make the bill become law. The laws are then the responsibility of the government to oversee and enforce.

== Terminology ==
Under Canada's Westminster-style parliamentary democracy, the terms government and Government of Canada refer specifically to the prime minister, Cabinet, and other members of the governing party inside the House of Commons, but typically includes the federal public service and federal departments and agencies when used elsewhere. This differs from the United States, where the executive branch is referred to as an administration and the federal government encompasses executive, legislative, and judicial powers, similar to the Canadian Crown.

In popular usage Canadians (especially under American influence) may refer to "the government" when speaking about the entire state, including not only executive but also the legislative and judicial branches and the civil service. More formally these would be referred to as the Crown or the Crown in Right of Canada. It is also common but erroneous to refer to "the Government of Canada" when speaking of all governmental bodies in Canada: Canada is a highly decentralized federation and the ten provincial and three territorial governments are very much separate from and act independently of the Canadian federal (central) government.

In press releases issued by federal departments, the government has sometimes been referred to as the current prime minister's government (e.g. the Trudeau Government). This terminology has been commonly employed in the media. In late 2010, an informal instruction from the Office of the Prime Minister urged government departments to consistently use, in all department communications, such phrasing (i.e., Harper Government, at the time), in place of Government of Canada. The same Cabinet earlier directed its press department to use the phrase Canada's New Government.

== Role of the Crown ==
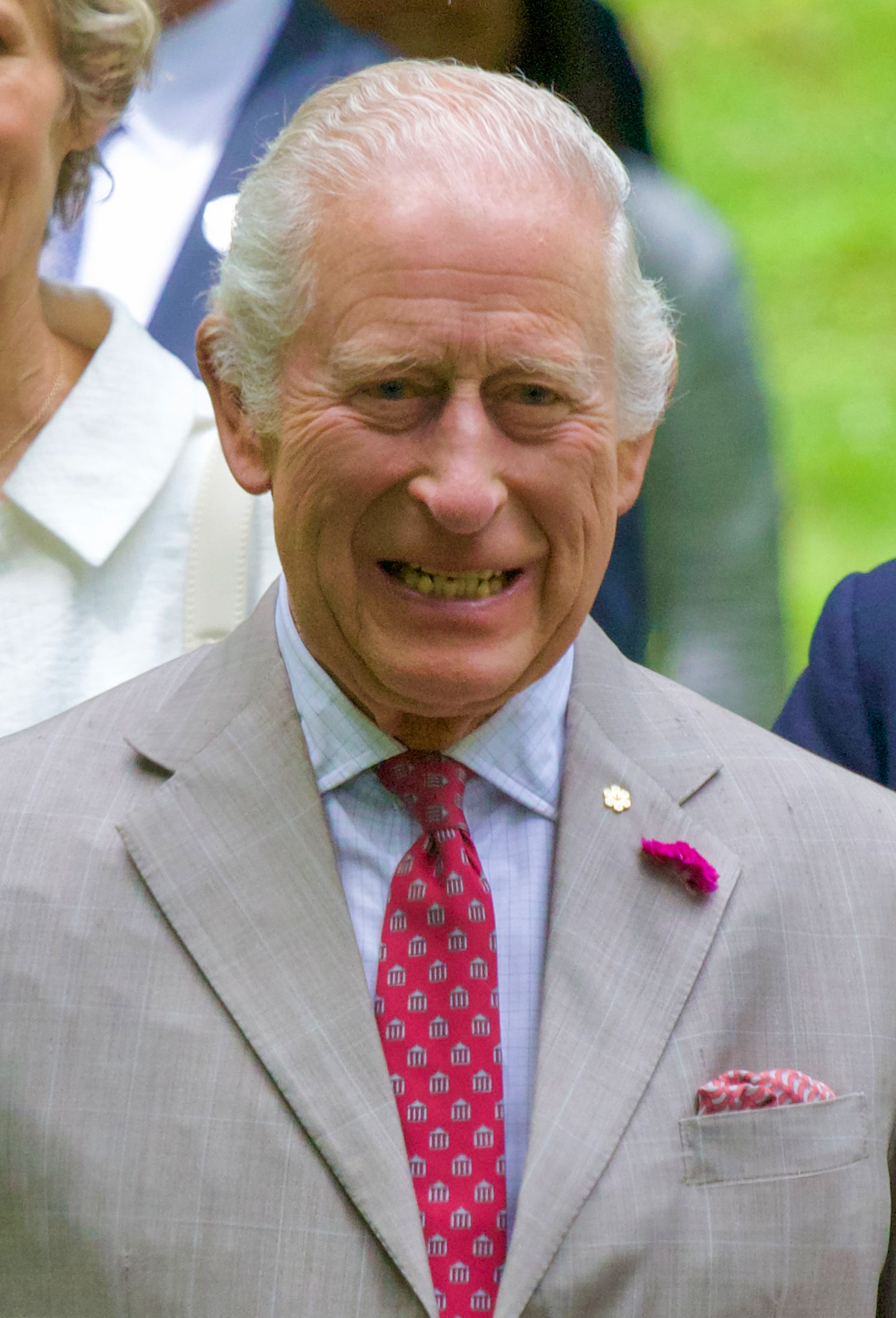
Charles III, King of Canada, the country's head of state

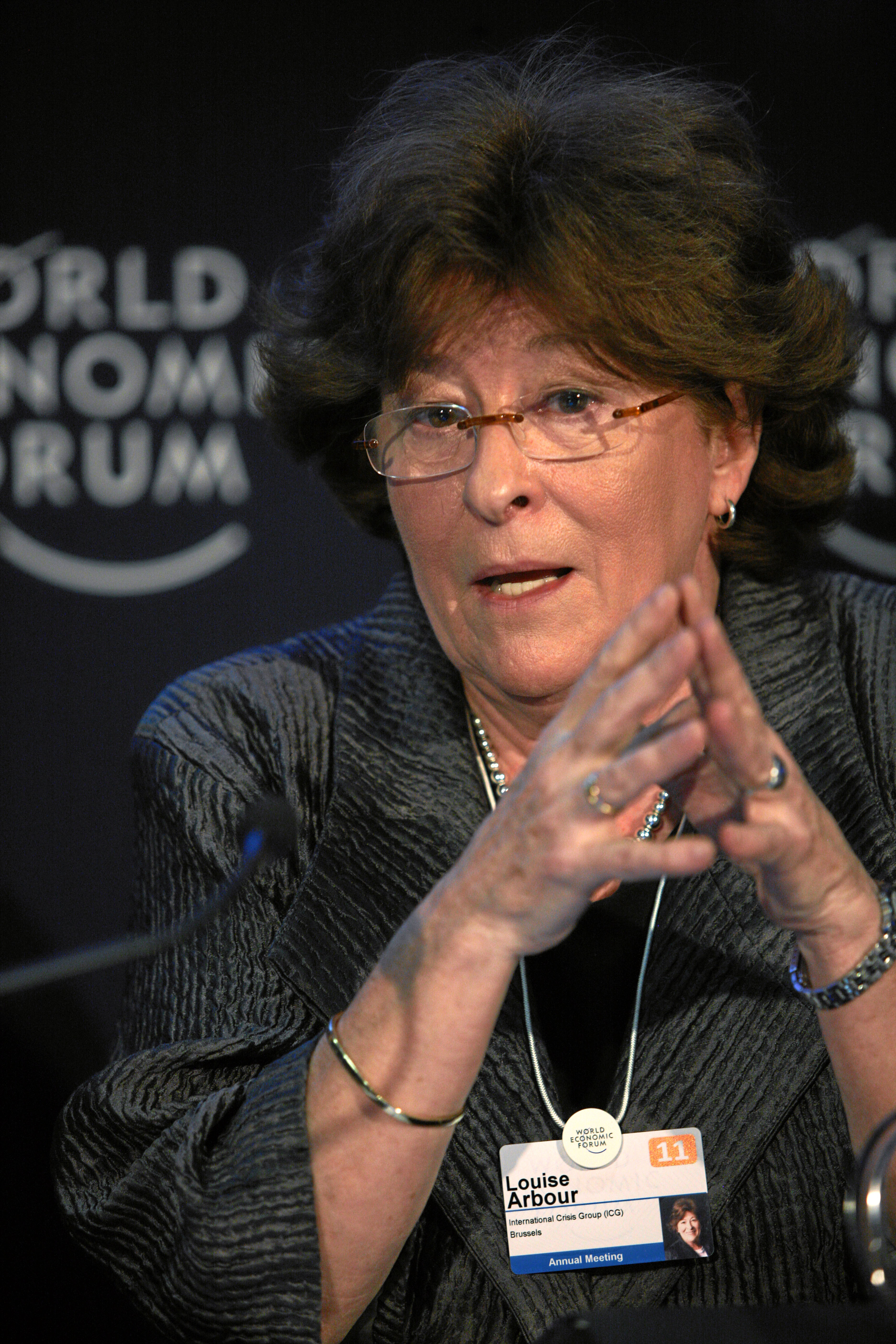
Louise Arbour, Governor General of Canada, the monarch's representative

Canada is a constitutional monarchy, wherein the role of the reigning sovereign is both legal and practical, but not political. The monarch is vested with all powers of state and sits at the centre of a construct in which the power of the whole is shared by multiple institutions of government acting under the sovereign's authority. The executive is thus formally referred to as the King-in-Council.

On the advice of the Canadian prime minister, the sovereign appoints a federal viceregal representative—the governor general (currently Louise Arbour)—who, since 1947, is permitted to exercise almost all of the monarch's royal prerogative; though, there are some duties which must be specifically performed by the monarch themselves (such as assent of certain bills). In case of the governor general's absence or incapacitation, the administrator of Canada performs the Crown's most basic functions.

As part of the royal prerogative, the royal sign-manual gives authority to letters patent and orders-in-Council. Much of the royal prerogative is only exercised in-council, meaning on the advice of the King's Privy Council for Canada (ministers of the Crown formed in Cabinet in conventional practice); within the conventional stipulations of a constitutional monarchy, the sovereign's direct participation in any of these areas of governance is limited.

== Prime Minister and Cabinet ==
The Government of Canada signature (above) and wordmark (below), used to corporately identify the government under the Federal Identity Program

The term Government of Canada, or more formally, His Majesty's Government, refers to the activities of the King-in-Council. The day-to-day operation and activities of the Government of Canada are performed by the federal departments and agencies, staffed by the Public Service of Canada, and the Canadian Armed Forces.

=== Prime Minister ===
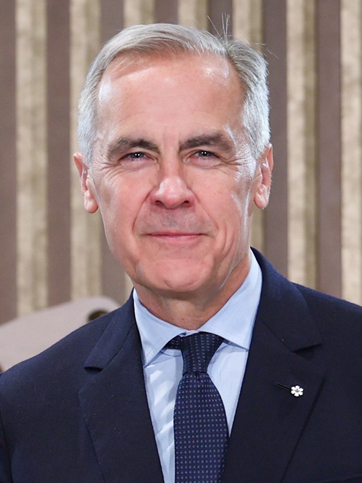
Mark Carney, Prime Minister and head of government

One of the main duties of the Crown is to ensure that a democratic government is always in place, which includes the appointment of a prime minister, who heads the Cabinet and directs the activities of the government. Not outlined in any constitutional document, the office exists in long-established convention, which stipulates the Crown must select as prime minister the person most likely to command the confidence of the elected House of Commons, who, in practice, is typically the leader of the political party that holds more seats than any other party in that chamber (currently the Liberal Party, led by Mark Carney). Should no particular party hold a majority in the House of Commons, the leader of one party—either the party with the most seats or one supported by other parties—will be called by the governor general to form a minority government. Once sworn in, the prime minister holds office until their resignation or removal by the governor general, after either a motion of no confidence or defeat in a general election.

=== Privy Council ===
The executive is defined in the Constitution Act, 1867 as the Crown acting on the advice of the King's Privy Council for Canada, referred to as the King-in-Council. However, the Privy Council—consisting mostly of former ministers, chief justices, and other elder statesmen—rarely meets in full. In the construct of constitutional monarchy and responsible government, the advice tendered is typically binding, meaning the monarch reigns but does not rule, with the Cabinet ruling "in trust" for the monarch. However, the royal prerogative belongs to the Crown and not to any of the ministers, and there are rare exceptions where the monarch may be obliged to act unilaterally to prevent manifestly unconstitutional acts.

==== Cabinet ====
The stipulations of responsible government require that those who directly advise the Crown on the exercise the royal prerogative be accountable to the elected House of Commons and the day-to-day operation of government is guided only by a sub-group of the Privy Council made up of individuals who hold seats in Parliament, known as the Cabinet.

The monarch and governor general typically follow the near-binding advice of their ministers. The royal prerogative, however, belongs to the Crown and not to any of the ministers, who only rule "in trust" for the monarch and who must relinquish the Crown's power back to it upon losing the confidence of the commons, whereupon a new government, which can hold the lower chamber's confidence, is installed by the governor general. The royal and vice-royal figures may unilaterally use these powers in exceptional constitutional crisis situations (an exercise of the reserve powers), (Note: See 'Responsibilities' and Note 1 at Cabinet of Canada.) thereby allowing the monarch to make sure "that the government conducts itself in compliance with the constitution." Politicians can sometimes try to use to their favour to obscure the complexity of the relationship between the monarch, viceroy, ministers, and Parliament, as well as the public's general unfamiliarity with such. (Note: It was said by Helen Forsey: "The inherent complexity and subtlety of this type of constitutional situation can make it hard for the general public to fully grasp the implications. That confusion gives an unscrupulous government plenty of opportunity to oversimplify and misrepresent, making much of the alleged conflict between popular democracy—supposedly embodied in the Prime Minister—and the constitutional mechanisms at the heart of responsible government, notably the 'reserve powers' of the Crown, which gets portrayed as illegitimate." As examples, she cited the campaign of William Lyon Mackenzie King following the King–Byng Affair of 1926 and Stephen Harper's comments during the 2008–2009 Canadian parliamentary dispute.)

== See also ==
- Canadian order of precedence
- Court system of Canada
- His Majesty's Government (term)
- Immigration, Refugees and Citizenship Canada
- Office-holders of Canada
- Parliament of Canada
- Politics of Canada
- Public Service of Canada
- Structure of the Canadian federal government
