= Deputy Prime Minister of Canada =

Cabinet position in the Canadian government

- Vice-premier ministre du Canada
- Incumbent; Vacant since December 16, 2024
- Government of Canada; Privy Council Office
- Style: The Honourable
- Member of: Parliament; Privy Council; Cabinet
- Reports to: House of Commons; Prime Minister
- Appointer: Monarch (represented by the governor general) on the advice of the prime minister
- Term length: At His Majesty's pleasure
- Inaugural holder: Allan MacEachen
- Formation: September 16, 1977
- Salary: CA$299,900 (2024) (Note: Including a basic sessional indemnity of CA$203,100 as Member of Parliament.)

The deputy prime minister of Canada (French: vice-première ministre du Canada) (Note: When the position is held by a male, the French title is vice-premier ministre du Canada") is a position in the Canadian Cabinet which is conferred from time to time by the prime minister of Canada to a senior cabinet member. That title does not have any formal standing in law or formal duties. It is not a ministerial office, in that there is no associated departmental portfolio, since it is almost always conferred on an individual who already holds a position as Cabinet minister. As a cabinet minister, deputy prime ministers are appointed to the Privy Council and styled as the Honourable (French: l'honorable), a privilege maintained for life.

The title has not been in use at any point in the Carney ministry that is currently in office. The title was last held by Chrystia Freeland in the Trudeau Ministry between 2019 and 2024, and before Freeland by Anne McLellan in the Martin ministry between 2003 and 2006.

The title deputy prime minister, a political title conferred upon cabinet members, should not be confused with the office of the Clerk of the Privy Council, who is both the deputy minister (a department's most senior civil servant) of the prime minister's department, the Privy Council Office, and the head of the entire civil service.

== History ==
=== Undisputed "second among equal" ===
George-Étienne Cartier formally served as co-premier of the Province of Canada with John A. Macdonald prior to Confederation, and there were little dispute among either contemporaries or historians that he remained of similar statue after Confederation until his death in 1873. He name was listed immediately after Macdonald's and ahead of all others when the first appointments to the new Privy Council of Canada were gazetted, and routinely deputized for Macdonald as acting Prime Minister during Macdonald’s absence. While there were cabinet members widely recognized for their outsized influence at various time in the century following Cartier's death, no person enjoyed similar undisputed statue in absence of formal recognition.

=== Designated Acting Prime Minister ===
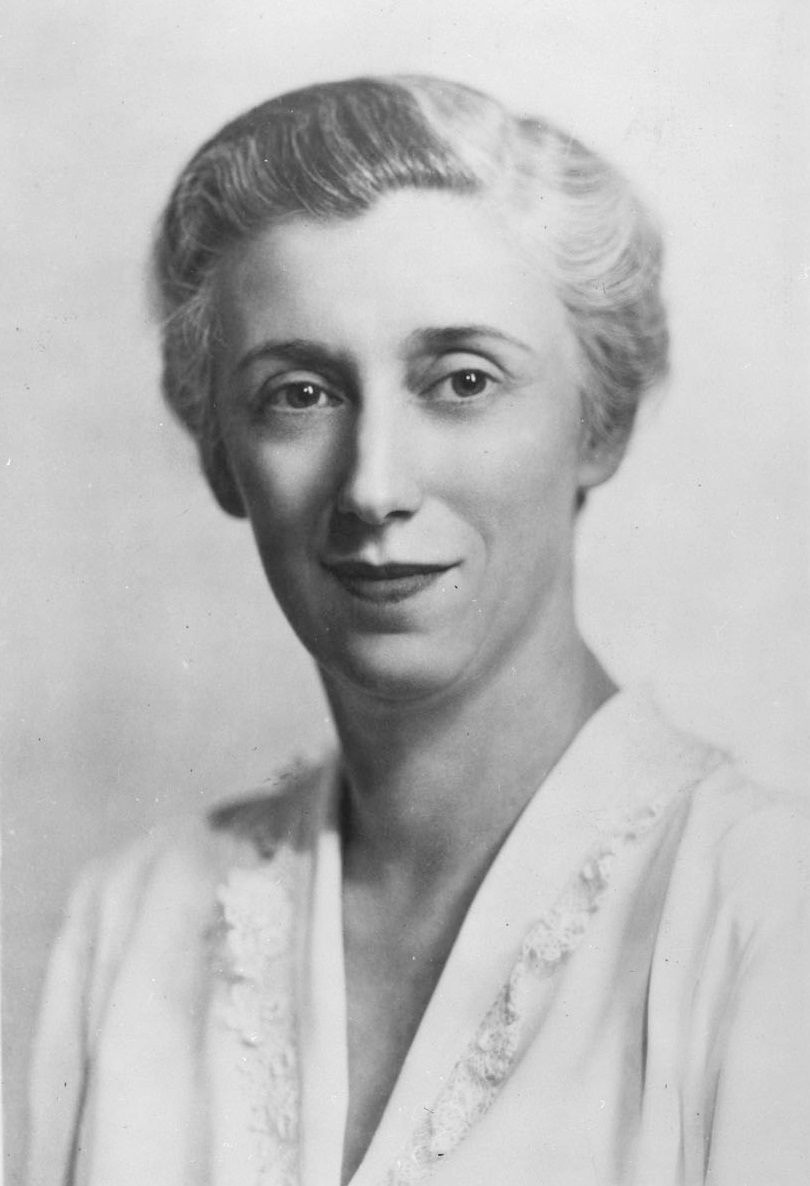
Ellen Fairclough served as acting prime minister from February 19 to 20, 1958, in the absence of John Diefenbaker.

Prior to the creation of the position of deputy prime minister, a prime minister would routinely name a member of the cabinet to temporarily act on the prime minister's behalf while the prime minister was away from the regular duties of his job for a period of time, such as being out of the country on a working visit or a vacation. The designation was functional in nature, with the delegate exercising the prime minister's authority when required in a caretaker capacity during the prime minister's absence; for example, in his capacity as acting prime minister, Mitchell Sharp ordered a precautionary one-day shutdown of government offices in Ottawa on August 20, 1970, as the storm that had spawned the Sudbury tornado headed toward Ottawa. An acting prime minister did not otherwise have the authority to act independently of the sitting prime minister in a legislative or political capacity, nor would an acting prime minister be considered to have actually served as prime minister.

Due to the routine and relatively minor nature of the role, few to no research sources exist to provide a complete list of everyone who was ever named as acting prime minister. However, John Diefenbaker's designation of Ellen Fairclough as acting prime minister on February 19 and 20, 1958, is historically noteworthy as Fairclough was the first woman ever so designated.

=== Former recognition ===
Following his victory in the 1968 Liberal leadership convention, Pierre Trudeau formed his first ministry with Paul Hellyer, a leadership rival who placed second to Trudeau on the first ballot, formally designated as "Senior Minister" in his cabinet, placing Hellyer ahead of other cabinet colleagues in the order of precedence, and specified that the senior minister as the default acting prime minister upon the absence of the prime minister. Trudeau also assigned Hellyer special policy responsibility for housing and urban development, which ironically trigger the falling out between the two and led to Hellyer's departure from the ministry and the Liberal Party. Following Hellyer's resignation in 1969, the title Senior Minister was never revived and Trudeau confer no senior status on any cabinet members for a number of years, leaving Hellyer as the only holder of the title in history.

Trudeau formally instituted the practice of formally appointing a cabinet member as Deputy Prime Minister in 1977, largely to recognize the long years of service of Allan MacEachen. MacEachen held the role from 1977 until the Liberals' defeat in the 1979 election, continued as deputy party leader during a brief period in opposition, resumed the role of Deputy Prime Minister when Trudeau was unexpected return to office and served as such for the remainder of Trudeau's premiership.

=== Modern practice ===
Deputy Prime Minister is a title, not an office, in that there is no formal department or ministerial office associated with the role, though all but one former Deputy Prime Minister held the title while heading a department. (The exception was Herb Grey, who was given charge of the transitory Millennium Bureau of Canada.) Whether to confer the title is at the discretion of the Prime Minister. Since it is not an office, there is no vacancy per se when the title is not in use. Since it was first conferred in 1977, it was not in use in the ministry of Joe Clark, Stephen Harper, Justin Trudeau during its first mandate, and in the Carney ministry currently in office.

The title was most recently held by Chrystia Freeland in the Trudeau Ministry from 2019 until her dramatic departure in 2024 which ultimately led to the end of Trudeau's premiership. Conferring the title on Freeland, MP for a downtown Toronto electoral district but was born and grew up in Peace River, Alberta, served partially as a response to the lack of representation in cabinet from the prairie provinces follow the defeat of veteran minister Ralph Goodale in Saskatchewan. Prior to Freeland, the title was last held by another Albertan, Anne McLellan who held the title for the entire duration of the ministry of Paul Martin between 2003 and 2006.

==== Alternative designation in absence of formal deputy ====
Harper gave special status in the line of authority to members of his cabinet: under an Order in Council issued on February 6, 2006—the day Harper was appointed prime minister—when "the prime minister is unable to perform the functions of his office", Lawrence Cannon, then Jim Prentice, then the balance of the Cabinet by order of precedence, were "authorized to act for the prime minister". This list was updated a number of times during Harper ministry, and in each case the first name on the list was also named the vice-chair of the cabinet's Priorities and Planning Committee, leading to some analysts inferring such person as being de facto deputy prime minister. Similarly, upon forming ministry in 2015, Justin Trudeau via an order-in-council designated Ralph Goodale, deputy party leader in opposition as first in line to discharge the prime minister's duties in the event Trudeau ever became incapacitated. Having first entered ministry two decades earlier and entered parliament four decades earlier, Goodale would have outranked all cabinet colleagues in any event. However, media analysts focused on Dominic Leblanc, a childhood friend of the Prime Minister whose father Romeo Leblanc served in the ministry of the prime minister's father, pointing to his placement on numerous key cabinet committees and as the government's liaison with the Senate as being the inferences as being "de facto deputy prime minister". The designation of both Cannon and Goodale were similar to those mentioned under section Designated Acting Prime Minister above in nature except on a more standing basis.

== Duties ==
The office has no standing in law and does not carry any formal duties or tasks. It is not one of the mandatory Cabinet positions created by statute. The prime minister may assign specific tasks in conjunction with the title. One duty which has evolved is to represent the prime minister in the House of Commons when the prime minister is absent. With the exceptions of Herb Gray and John Manley, all deputy prime ministers have held another ministerial portfolio alongside this title.

According to journalist Joseph Brean of the Postmedia Network, the role can sometimes be "a poisoned chalice, or a leash to keep a rival under close control" rather than an indication that the Prime Minister trusts the authority of the deputy. For the political analysis magazine Policy Options Eugene Lang and Greg Schmidt describe the role as one of "soft power", in which a deputy prime minister only carries as much or as little power within a government as the prime minister chooses to permit them; the level of power is usually communicated less by the deputy prime minister's title itself, and more by what other roles they hold alongside it.

One deputy prime minister, Sheila Copps, attracted controversy in 1993 after asserting that she was "in charge" of government business while the then prime minister, Jean Chrétien, was on a brief holiday. After she left politics, she wrote that although the position of deputy prime minister is only ceremonial, "very often, the DPM's job was to protect the prime minister from the political damage that Question Period can inflict on a leader", further citing the experience of Erik Nielsen during the Sinclair Stevens scandal.

== Succession ==
As a title conferred by the prime minister, the deputy prime minister title expires automatically along with all ministry appointments upon the conferring prime minister's resignation.

A deputy prime minister has no automatic right of succession upon the incumbent's death of resignation while their party maintains the confidence of the House of Commons. Rather, constitutional convention requires the governor general to consult the governing party regarding the leadership, and to call on a member of that party's caucus to assume the premiership. No prime minister has died in office since 1891, many decades before the title of deputy prime minister was first conferred.

== List of deputy prime ministers ==
Liberal

Conservative

Progressive Conservative

	Portrait	Name Electoral district (Birth–Death)	Term of office	Other portfolios or responsibilities	Prime minister Party (Ministry)
-		Paul Hellyer; MP for Trinity (1923–2021)	April 30, 1968 – April 23, 1969	Appointed Senior Minister: Minister of Transport	Pierre Trudeau; Liberal (20th)
Title not yet instituted			April 23, 1969 – September 16, 1977		Pierre Trudeau; Liberal (20th)
Deputy Prime Minister					Pierre Trudeau; Liberal (20th)
1		Allan MacEachen; MP for Cape Breton Highlands—Canso (1921–2017)	September 16, 1977 – June 4, 1979	President of the Privy Council; Government House Leader	Pierre Trudeau; Liberal (20th)
Title not in use			June 4, 1979 – March 3, 1980		Joe Clark; PC (21st)
(1)		Allan MacEachen (second time)	March 3, 1980 – June 30, 1984	Minister of Finance (until 1982); Secretary of State for External Affairs (from 1982)	Pierre Trudeau; Liberal (22nd)
2		Jean Chrétien; MP for Saint-Maurice (b. 1934)	June 30, 1984 – September 17, 1984	Secretary of State for External Affairs	John Turner; Liberal (23rd)
3		Erik Nielsen; MP for Yukon (1924–2008)	September 17, 1984 – June 30, 1986	President of the Privy Council (until 1985); Minister of National Defence (from 1985)	Brian Mulroney; PC (24th)
4		Don Mazankowski; MP for Vegreville (1935–2020)	June 30, 1986 – June 25, 1993	President of the Privy Council (until 1991); Government House Leader (until 1989); President of the Treasury Board (1987–88); Minister of Agriculture (1988–91); Minister of Finance (from 1991)	Brian Mulroney; PC (24th)
5		Jean Charest; MP for Sherbrooke (b. 1958)	June 25, 1993 – November 4, 1993	Minister of Industry	Kim Campbell; PC (25th)
6		Sheila Copps; MP for Hamilton East (b. 1952)	November 4, 1993 – April 30, 1996	Minister of the Environment (until 1996); Minister of Multiculturalism and Citizenship (from 1996)	Jean Chrétien; Liberal (26th)
Title in abeyance (Note: The use of the title deputy prime minister was briefly suspended in 1996 when Copps, after being challenged on her 1993 campaign promise to resign if the government did not repeal the Goods and Services Tax, resigned from Parliament and recontested her seat in a byelection. Chrétien did not name a replacement during Copps' absence from Parliament. After winning the byelection and returning to Parliament, Copps was reappointed to the position.)			April 30, 1996 – June 19, 1996		Jean Chrétien; Liberal (26th)
(6)		Sheila Copps (resumed title)	June 19, 1996 – June 11, 1997	Minister of Multiculturalism and Citizenship/ Minister of Canadian Heritage (portfolio restructured, 1996)	Jean Chrétien; Liberal (26th)
7		Herb Gray; MP for Windsor West (1931–2014)	June 11, 1997 – January 15, 2002	Minister responsible for the Millenium Bureau of Canada (1998–2002); Political minister for Ontario	Jean Chrétien; Liberal (26th)
8		John Manley; MP for Ottawa South (b. 1950)	January 15, 2002 – December 12, 2003	Minister of Finance (from 2002)	Jean Chrétien; Liberal (26th)
9		Anne McLellan; MP for Edmonton West (until 2004); MP for Edmonton Centre (from 2004) (b. 1950)	December 12, 2003 – February 6, 2006	Solicitor General of Canada (portfolio renamed in 2005) / Minister of Public Safety and Emergency Preparedness	Paul Martin; Liberal (27th)
Title not in use			February 6, 2006 – November 20, 2019		S. Harper; CPC (28th)
Title not in use			February 6, 2006 – November 20, 2019		Justin Trudeau; Liberal (29th)
10		Chrystia Freeland; MP for University—Rosedale (b. 1968)	November 20, 2019 – December 16, 2024	Minister of Intergovernmental Affairs (until 2020); Minister of Finance (from 2020)	Justin Trudeau; Liberal (29th)
Title not in use			December 16, 2024 – present		Justin Trudeau; Liberal (29th)
Title not in use			December 16, 2024 – present		Mark Carney; Liberal (30th)

== See also ==
- Deputy Premier (Canada)
