= President of the King's Privy Council for Canada =

Canadian cabinet position

- Président du Conseil privé du Roi pour le Canada
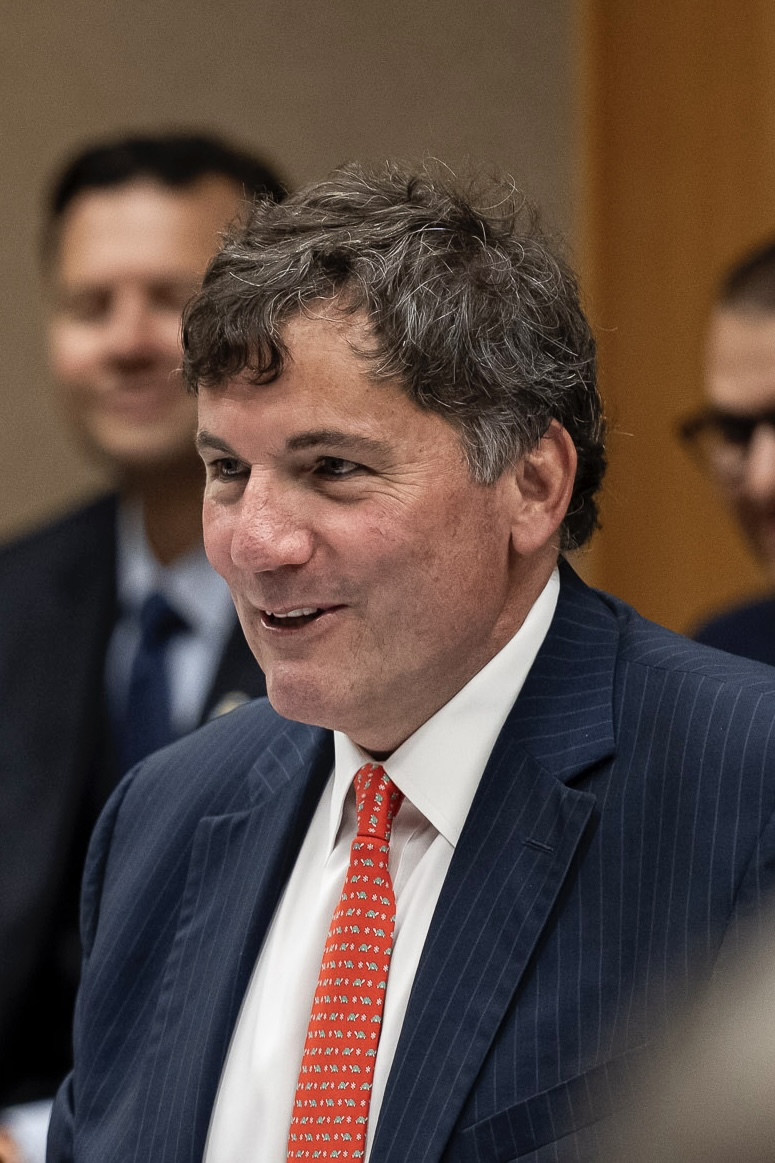
- Incumbent; Dominic LeBlanc since March 14, 2025
- King's Privy Council for Canada
- Style: The Honourable
- Member of: House of Commons; Privy Council; Cabinet
- Reports to: Parliament; Prime Minister
- Appointer: Monarch (represented by the governor general); on the advice of the prime minister
- Term length: At His Majesty's pleasure
- Inaugural holder: Adam Johnston Fergusson Blair
- Formation: 1 July 1867
- Salary: CA$299,900 (2024)
- Website: pco-bcp.gc.ca

President of the King's Privy Council for Canada (French: Président du Conseil privé du Roi pour le Canada) (Note: Referred to as the President of the Queen's Privy Council for Canada (French: Président du Conseil privé de la Reine pour le Canada) during the reign of a female monarch.) is the title held by a member of the Canadian Cabinet who has the – largely ceremonial – duty of chairing meetings of the Privy Council. The Privy Council president often holds an additional portfolio, commonly minister of intergovernmental affairs, and is supported by the Privy Council Office.

Dominic LeBlanc has been President of the Privy Council since March 14, 2025; he previously held the role from 2018 to 2021. LeBlanc concurrently serves as the minister responsible for Canada-U.S. trade, intergovernmental affairs and one Canadian economy. The officeholder is selected by the prime minister of Canada and appointed by the Crown.

The president of the Privy Council has additionally been designated as the minister responsible for the Major Projects Office since 2025.

== Role ==
The president of the Privy Council has the largely ceremonial duty of presiding over meetings of the Privy Council, a body which only convenes in full for affairs of state such as the accession of a new Sovereign or the marriage of the Prince of Wales or heir presumptive to the Throne. Accordingly, the last time the president of the Privy Council had to preside over a meeting of the Privy Council was in 2022 for the proclamation of the accession of King Charles III. It is the equivalent of the office of lord president of the council in the United Kingdom.

Under prime ministers Pierre Trudeau and Joe Clark, the position was synonymous with that of government house leader. In 1989, the government house leader became a separate position and the president of the Privy Council became a largely honorary title (not unlike that of deputy prime minister of Canada) given to a senior minister in addition to other portfolios. From 1993 it has regularly been held by whoever holds the portfolio of minister of intergovernmental affairs. In the past decade the position has generally been seen to be the closest thing to a sinecure posting within the Cabinet.

== List of presidents of the Privy Council ==
| President of the Privy Council Parliamentary seat while President (Party affiliation) (Birth–Death) | | Term of office | Concurrent Cabinet Posts | Ministry Party Term of ministry | Monarch Reign |
|---|---|---|---|---|---|
| 1 | Adam Johnston Fergusson Blair; Senator for Ontario (Liberal, from October 1867) (1815–1867) | 1 July 1867 30 December 1867 | none | Macdonald (1st); Conservative (1867–1873) | Victoria (1837–1901) |
| – | John A. Macdonald; MP for Kingston (Liberal-Conservative) (1815–1891); Acting President of the Privy Council | 30 December 1867 30 January 1869 | (acting) | Macdonald (1st); Conservative (1867–1873) | Victoria (1837–1901) |
| 2 | Joseph Howe; MP for Hants (Liberal-Conservative) (1804–1873) | 30 January 1869 16 November 1869 | none | Macdonald (1st); Conservative (1867–1873) | Victoria (1837–1901) |
| 3 | Edward Kenny; Senator for Nova Scotia (Conservative) (1800–1891) | 16 November 1869 21 June 1870 | none | Macdonald (1st); Conservative (1867–1873) | Victoria (1837–1901) |
| 4 | Charles Tupper; MP for Cumberland (Conservative) (1821–1915) | 21 June 1870 2 July 1872 | none | Macdonald (1st); Conservative (1867–1873) | Victoria (1837–1901) |
| 5 | John O'Connor; MP for Essex (Conservative) (1824–1887) | 2 July 1872 4 March 1873 | none | Macdonald (1st); Conservative (1867–1873) | Victoria (1837–1901) |
| – | John A. Macdonald; MP for Kingston (Liberal-Conservative) (1815–1891); Acting President of the Privy Council | 4 March 1873 14 June 1873 | (acting) | Macdonald (1st); Conservative (1867–1873) | Victoria (1837–1901) |
| 6 | Hugh McDonald; MP for Antigonish (Liberal-Conservative) (1827–1899) | 14 June 1873 |1 July 1873 | none | Macdonald (1st); Conservative (1867–1873) | Victoria (1837–1901) |
| – | John A. Macdonald; MP for Kingston (Liberal-Conservative) (1815–1891); Acting President of the Privy Council | 1 July 1873 7 November 1873 | (acting) | Macdonald (1st); Conservative (1867–1873) | Victoria (1837–1901) |
| – | Alexander Mackenzie; MP for Lambton (Liberal) (1822–1892); Acting President of the Privy Council | 7 November 1873 20 January 1874 | (acting) | Mackenzie (2nd); Liberal (1873–1878) | Victoria (1837–1901) |
| 7 | Lucius Seth Huntington; MP for Shefford (Liberal) (1827–1886) | 20 January 1874 9 October 1875 | none | Mackenzie (2nd); Liberal (1873–1878) | Victoria (1837–1901) |
| – | Alexander Mackenzie; MP for Lambton (Liberal) (1822–1892); Acting President of the Privy Council | 9 October 1875 7 December 1875 | (acting) | Mackenzie (2nd); Liberal (1873–1878) | Victoria (1837–1901) |
| 8 | Joseph-Édouard Cauchon; MP for Quebec-Centre (Conservative) (1816–1885) | 7 December 1875 8 June 1877 | none | Mackenzie (2nd); Liberal (1873–1878) | Victoria (1837–1901) |
| 9 | Edward Blake; MP for Bruce South (Liberal) (1833–1912) | 8 June 1877 17 January 1878 | none | Mackenzie (2nd); Liberal (1873–1878) | Victoria (1837–1901) |
| – | Alexander Mackenzie; MP for Lambton (Liberal) (1822–1892); Acting President of the Privy Council | 18 January 1878 17 October 1878 | (acting) | Mackenzie (2nd); Liberal (1873–1878) | Victoria (1837–1901) |
| (5) | John O'Connor; MP for Russell (Conservative) (1824–1887) | 17 October 1878 16 January 1880 | none | Macdonald (3rd); Conservative (1878–1891) | Victoria (1837–1901) |
| 10 | Louis-Rodrigue Masson; MP for Terrebonne (Conservative) (1833–1903) | 16 January 1880 1 August 1880 | none | Macdonald (3rd); Conservative (1878–1891) | Victoria (1837–1901) |
| – | John A. Macdonald; MP for Victoria (Liberal-Conservative) (1815–1891); Acting President of the Privy Council | 1 August 1880 8 November 1880 | (acting) | Macdonald (3rd); Conservative (1878–1891) | Victoria (1837–1901) |
| 11 | Joseph-Alfred Mousseau; MP for Bagot (Conservative) (1837–1886) | 8 November 1880 20 May 1881 | none | Macdonald (3rd); Conservative (1878–1891) | Victoria (1837–1901) |
| 12 | Archibald McLelan; MP for Colchester (Conservative) (1824–1890) | 20 May 1881 10 July 1882 | none | Macdonald (3rd); Conservative (1878–1891) | Victoria (1837–1901) |
| 13 | John A. Macdonald; MP for Carleton (until 1887); MP for Kingston (from 1887) (Liberal-Conservative) (1815–1891); Acting President of the Privy Council prior to 17 October 1883 | 17 October 1883 28 November 1889 | Prime Minister Superintendent-General of Indian Affairs (1878–87, 88) | Macdonald (3rd); Conservative (1878–1891) | Victoria (1837–1901) |
| 14 | Charles Carroll Colby; MP for Stanstead (Note: Defeated in general election prior to relinquishing office) (Liberal-Conservative) (1827–1907) | 28 November 1889 1 May 1891 | none | Macdonald (3rd); Conservative (1878–1891) | Victoria (1837–1901) |
| – | John A. Macdonald; MP for Kingston (Liberal-Conservative) (1815–1891); Acting President of the Privy Council | 1 May 1891 16 June 1891 | (acting) | Macdonald (3rd); Conservative (1878–1891) | Victoria (1837–1901) |
| 15 | John Abbott; Senator for Inkerman, Quebec (Liberal-Conservative) (1821–1893) | 16 June 1891 5 December 1892 | Prime Minister | Abbott (4th); Conservative (1891–1892) | Victoria (1837–1901) |
| – | John Sparrow David Thompson; MP for Antigonish (Liberal-Conservative) (1845–1894); Acting President of the Privy Council | 5 December 1892 7 December 1892 | (acting) | Thompson (5th); Conservative (1892–1894) | Victoria (1837–1901) |
| 16 | William Bullock Ives; MP for Town of Sherbrooke (Conservative) (1841–1899) | 7 December 1892 12 December 1894 | none | Thompson (5th); Conservative (1892–1894) | Victoria (1837–1901) |
| 17 | Mackenzie Bowell; Senator for Hastings, Ontario (Conservative) (1823–1917) | 21 December 1894 1 May 1896 | Prime Minister | Bowell (6th); Conservative (1894–1896) | Victoria (1837–1901) |
| 18 | Auguste-Réal Angers; Senator for De la Vallière, Quebec (Note: Resigned from the Senate prior to relinquishing office)(Conservative) (1837–1919) | 1 May 1896 8 July 1896 | none | Tupper (7th); Conservative (1896) | Victoria (1837–1901) |
| 19 | Wilfrid Laurier; MP for Quebec East (Liberal) (1841–1919) | 11 July 1896 10 October 1911 | Prime Minister | Laurier (8th); Liberal (1896–1911) | Victoria (1837–1901) |
| 19 | Wilfrid Laurier; MP for Quebec East (Liberal) (1841–1919) | 11 July 1896 10 October 1911 | Prime Minister | Laurier (8th); Liberal (1896–1911) | Edward VII (1901–1910) |
| 19 | Wilfrid Laurier; MP for Quebec East (Liberal) (1841–1919) | 11 July 1896 10 October 1911 | Prime Minister | Laurier (8th); Liberal (1896–1911) | George V (1910–1936) |
| 20 | Robert Borden; MP for Halifax (Conservative, until 1917) MP for Kings (Unionist, from 1917) (Conservative) (1854–1937) | 10 October 1911 12 October 1917 | Prime Minister | Borden (9th); Conservative (1911–1917) (10th); Unionist (1917-1920) | George V (1910–1936) |
| 21 | Newton Rowell; MP for Durham (Unionist) (1867–1941) | 12 October 1917 10 July 1920 | Minister presiding Department of Health (1919–20) | Borden (9th); Conservative (1911–1917) (10th); Unionist (1917-1920) | George V (1910–1936) |
| 22 | James Alexander Calder; MP for Moose Jaw (Unionist) (1868–1956) | 10 July 1920 21 September 1921 | Minister of Immigration and Colonization, Minister presiding Department of Health | Meighen; 11th Unionist (1920–1921) | George V (1910–1936) |
| 23 | Louis-Philippe Normand; Candidate in Three Rivers and St. Maurice (Unionist) (1863–1928) | 21 September 1921 29 December 1921 | none | Meighen; 11th Unionist (1920–1921) | George V (1910–1936) |
| 24 | William Lyon Mackenzie King; MP for York North until 1925; MP for Prince Albert from 1926 (Liberal) (1874–1950) | 29 December 1921 29 June 1926 | Prime Minister, Secretary of State for External Affairs | King (12th); Liberal (1921–1926) | George V (1910–1936) |
| 25 | Arthur Meighen; MP for Portage la Prairie (Conservative) (1874–1960) | 29 June 1926 25 September 1926 | Prime Minister, Secretary of State for External Affairs | Meighen (13th); Conservative (1926) | George V (1910–1936) |
| (24) | William Lyon Mackenzie King; MP for Prince Albert (Liberal) (1874–1950) | 25 September 1926 7 August 1930 | Prime Minister, Secretary of State for External Affairs | King (14th); Liberal (1926–1930) | George V (1910–1936) |
| 26 | R. B. Bennett; MP for Calgary West (Conservative) (1870–1947) | 7 August 1930 23 October 1935 | Prime Minister, Minister of Finance (until 1932), Secretary of State for External Affairs, | Bennett (15th); Conservative (1930–1935) | George V (1910–1936) |
| (24) | William Lyon Mackenzie King; MP for Prince Albert until 1945; MP for Glengarry from 1945 (Liberal) (1874–1950) | 23 October 1935 15 November 1948 | Prime Minister, Secretary of State for External Affairs (until 1946) | King (16th); Liberal (1935–1948) | George V (1910–1936) |
| (24) | William Lyon Mackenzie King; MP for Prince Albert until 1945; MP for Glengarry from 1945 (Liberal) (1874–1950) | 23 October 1935 15 November 1948 | Prime Minister, Secretary of State for External Affairs (until 1946) | King (16th); Liberal (1935–1948) | Edward VIII (1936) |
| (24) | William Lyon Mackenzie King; MP for Prince Albert until 1945; MP for Glengarry from 1945 (Liberal) (1874–1950) | 23 October 1935 15 November 1948 | Prime Minister, Secretary of State for External Affairs (until 1946) | King (16th); Liberal (1935–1948) | George VI (1936–1952) |
| 27 | Louis St. Laurent; MP for Quebec East (Liberal) (1882–1973) | 15 November 1948 25 April 1957 | Prime Minister | St. Laurent (17th); Liberal (1948–1957) | George VI (1936–1952) |
| 27 | Louis St. Laurent; MP for Quebec East (Liberal) (1882–1973) | 15 November 1948 25 April 1957 | Prime Minister | St. Laurent (17th); Liberal (1948–1957) | Elizabeth II (1952–2022) |
| 28 | Lionel Chevrier; MP for Laurier (Liberal) (1903–1987) | 25 April 1957 21 June 1957 | none | St. Laurent (17th); Liberal (1948–1957) | Elizabeth II (1952–2022) |
| 29 | John Diefenbaker; MP for Prince Albert (Progressive Conservative) (1895–1979) | 21 June 1957 28 December 1961 | Prime Minister | Diefenbaker (18th); Progressive; Conservative (1957–1963) | Elizabeth II (1952–2022) |
| 30 | Noël Dorion; MP for Bellechasse (Progressive Conservative) (1904–1980) | 28 December 1961 5 July 1962 | none | Diefenbaker (18th); Progressive; Conservative (1957–1963) | Elizabeth II (1952–2022) |
| (29) | John Diefenbaker; MP for Prince Albert (Progressive Conservative) (1895–1979); Acting President of the Privy Council prior to 21 December 1962 | 5 July 1962 22 April 1963 | Prime Minister | Diefenbaker (18th); Progressive; Conservative (1957–1963) | Elizabeth II (1952–2022) |
| 31 | Maurice Lamontagne; MP for Outremont–Saint-Jean (Liberal) (1917–1983) | 22 April 1963 3 February 1964 | none | Pearson (19th); Liberal (1963–1968) | Elizabeth II (1952–2022) |
| 32 | George McIlraith; MP for Outremont–Saint-Jean (Liberal) (1908–1992) | 3 February 1964 7 July 1965 | none | Pearson (19th); Liberal (1963–1968) | Elizabeth II (1952–2022) |
| 33 | Guy Favreau; MP for Papineau (Liberal) (1917–1967) | 7 July 1965 4 April 1967 | Registrar General (from 1966) | Pearson (19th); Liberal (1963–1968) | Elizabeth II (1952–2022) |
| 34 | Walter L. Gordon; MP for Davenport (Liberal) (1906–1987) | 4 April 1967 11 March 1968 | none | Pearson (19th); Liberal (1963–1968) | Elizabeth II (1952–2022) |
| – | Pierre Trudeau; MP for Mount Royal (Liberal) (1919–2000); Acting President of the Privy Council | 11 March 1968 2 May 1968 | (acting) | Pearson (19th); Liberal (1963–1968) | Elizabeth II (1952–2022) |
| – | Pierre Trudeau; MP for Mount Royal (Liberal) (1919–2000); Acting President of the Privy Council | 11 March 1968 2 May 1968 | (acting) | P. Trudeau (20th); Liberal (1968–1979) | Elizabeth II (1952–2022) |
| – | Allan MacEachen; MP for Inverness—Richmond/Cape Breton Highlands—Canso (Liberal) (1921–2017); Acting President of the Privy Council | 2 May 1968 6 July 1968 | (acting) | P. Trudeau (20th); Liberal (1968–1979) | Elizabeth II (1952–2022) |
| 35 | Donald Stovel Macdonald; MP for Rosedale (Liberal) (1932–2018) | 6 July 1968 24 September 1970 | Government House Leader | P. Trudeau (20th); Liberal (1968–1979) | Elizabeth II (1952–2022) |
| 36 | Allan MacEachen; MP for Cape Breton Highlands—Canso (Liberal) (1921–2017) | 24 September 1970 8 August 1974 | Government House Leader | P. Trudeau (20th); Liberal (1968–1979) | Elizabeth II (1952–2022) |
| 37 | Mitchell Sharp; MP for Eglinton (Liberal) (1911–2004) | 8 August 1974 14 September 1976 | Government House Leader | P. Trudeau (20th); Liberal (1968–1979) | Elizabeth II (1952–2022) |
| (36) | Allan MacEachen; MP for Cape Breton Highlands—Canso (Liberal) (1921–2017) | 14 September 1976 4 June 1979 | Government House Leader | P. Trudeau (20th); Liberal (1968–1979) | Elizabeth II (1952–2022) |
| 38 | Walter Baker; MP for Nepean—Carleton (Progressive Conservative) (1930–1983) | 4 June 1979 3 March 1980 | Minister of National Revenue | Clark (21st); Progressive; Conservative (1979–1980) | Elizabeth II (1952–2022) |
| 39 | Yvon Pinard; MP for Drummond (Liberal) (born 1940) | 3 March 1980 30 June 1984 | Government House Leader | P. Trudeau (22nd); Liberal (1980–1984) | Elizabeth II (1952–2022) |
| 40 | André Ouellet; MP for Papineau (Liberal) (born 1939) | 30 June 1984 17 September 1984 | Minister of Labour | Turner (23rd); Liberal (Liberal) (1984) | Elizabeth II (1952–2022) |
| 41 | Erik Nielsen; MP for Yukon (Progressive Conservative) (1924–2008) | 17 September 1984 27 February 1985 | Deputy Prime Minister | Mulroney (24th); Progressive; Conservative (1984–1993) | Elizabeth II (1952–2022) |
| 42 | Ray Hnatyshyn; MP for Saskatoon West (Progressive Conservative) (1934–2002) | 27 February 1985 30 June 1986 | Government House Leader | Mulroney (24th); Progressive; Conservative (1984–1993) | Elizabeth II (1952–2022) |
| 43 | Don Mazankowski; MP for Vegreville (Progressive Conservative) (1935–2020) | 30 June 1986 21 April 1991 | Deputy Prime Minister, Government House Leader | Mulroney (24th); Progressive; Conservative (1984–1993) | Elizabeth II (1952–2022) |
| 44 | Joe Clark; MP for Yellowhead (Progressive Conservative) (born 1939) | 21 April 1991 25 June 1993 | Minister responsible for Constitutional Affairs | Mulroney (24th); Progressive; Conservative (1984–1993) | Elizabeth II (1952–2022) |
| 45 | Pierre Blais; MP for Bellechasse (Progressive Conservative) (born 1948) | 25 June 1993 4 November 1993 | Minister of Justice and Attorney General | Campbell (25th); Conservative (1993) | Elizabeth II (1952–2022) |
| 46 | Marcel Massé; MP for Hull—Aylmer (Liberal) (born 1940) | 4 November 1993 25 January 1996 | Minister of Intergovernmental Affairs | Chrétien; 26th Liberal (1993–2003) | Elizabeth II (1952–2022) |
| 47 | Stéphane Dion; MP for Saint-Laurent—Cartierville (Liberal) (born 1955) | 25 January 1996 12 December 2003 | Minister of Intergovernmental Affairs | Chrétien; 26th Liberal (1993–2003) | Elizabeth II (1952–2022) |
| 48 | Denis Coderre; MP for Bourassa (Liberal) (born 1963) | 12 December 2003 20 July 2004 | Minister res. for La Francophonie, for the Office of Indian Residential Schools Resolution, Federal interlocutor for Métis and non-status Indians | Martin; 27th Liberal (2003–2006) | Elizabeth II (1952–2022) |
| 49 | Lucienne Robillard; MP for Westmount—Ville-Marie (Liberal) (born 1945) | 20 July 2004 7 February 2006 | Minister of Intergovernmental Affairs | Martin; 27th Liberal (2003–2006) | Elizabeth II (1952–2022) |
| 50 | Michael Chong; MP for Wellington—Halton Hills (Conservative) (born 1971) | 7 February 2006 27 November 2006 | Minister of Intergovernmental Affairs, Minister of State for Sport | Harper (28th); Conservative (2006–2015) | Elizabeth II (1952–2022) |
| 51 | Peter Van Loan; MP for York—Simcoe (Conservative) (born 1963) | 27 November 2006 4 January 2007 | Minister of Intergovernmental Affairs | Harper (28th); Conservative (2006–2015) | Elizabeth II (1952–2022) |
| 52 | Rona Ambrose; MP for Edmonton—Spruce Grove (Conservative) (born 1969) | 4 January 2007 30 October 2008 | Minister of Intergovernmental Affairs | Harper (28th); Conservative (2006–2015) | Elizabeth II (1952–2022) |
| 53 | Josée Verner; MP for Louis-Saint-Laurent (Conservative) (born 1959) | 30 October 2008 18 May 2011 | Minister of Intergovernmental Affairs | Harper (28th); Conservative (2006–2015) | Elizabeth II (1952–2022) |
| 54 | Peter Penashue; MP for Labrador (Conservative) (born 1964) | 18 May 2011 14 March 2013 | Minister of Intergovernmental Affairs | Harper (28th); Conservative (2006–2015) | Elizabeth II (1952–2022) |
| 55 | Denis Lebel; MP for Roberval—Lac-Saint-Jean (Conservative) (born 1954) | 15 March 2013 4 November 2015 | Minister of Intergovernmental Affairs, Minister of Infrastructure | Harper (28th); Conservative (2006–2015) | Elizabeth II (1952–2022) |
| 56 | Maryam Monsef; MP for Peterborough—Kawartha (Liberal) (born 1984) | 4 November 2015 10 January 2017 | Minister of Democratic Institutions | J. Trudeau (29th); Liberal (2015–2025) | Elizabeth II (1952–2022) |
| 57 | Karina Gould; MP for Burlington (Liberal) (born 1987) | 10 January 2017 18 July 2018 | Minister of Democratic Institutions | J. Trudeau (29th); Liberal (2015–2025) | Elizabeth II (1952–2022) |
| 58 | Dominic LeBlanc; MP for Beauséjour (Liberal) (born 1967) | 18 July 2018 26 October 2021 | Minister of Intergovernmental Affairs, Northern Affairs and Internal Trade | J. Trudeau (29th); Liberal (2015–2025) | Elizabeth II (1952–2022) |
| 59 | Bill Blair; MP for Scarborough Southwest (Liberal) (born 1954) | 26 October 2021 26 July 2023 | Minister of Emergency Preparedness | J. Trudeau (29th); Liberal (2015–2025) | Elizabeth II (1952–2022) |
| 59 | Bill Blair; MP for Scarborough Southwest (Liberal) (born 1954) | 26 October 2021 26 July 2023 | Minister of Emergency Preparedness | J. Trudeau (29th); Liberal (2015–2025) | Charles III (since 2022) |
| 60 | Harjit Sajjan; MP for Vancouver South (Liberal) (born 1970) | 26 July 2023 14 March 2025 | Minister of Emergency Preparedness, Minister responsible for the Pacific Economic Development Agency of Canada | J. Trudeau (29th); Liberal (2015–2025) | Charles III (since 2022) |
| (58) | Dominic LeBlanc; MP for Beauséjour (Liberal) (born 1967) | 14 March 2025 Incumbent | Minister of Internal Trade, Minister responsible for Canada-U.S. Trade, Intergovernmental Affairs and One Canadian Economy | Carney (30th); Liberal (since 2025) | Charles III (since 2022) |

== Notes ==
1. Referred to as the President of the Queen's Privy Council for Canada (French: Président du Conseil privé de la Reine pour le Canada) during the reign of a female monarch.
