= Major Projects Office =

Infrastructure office in Canada

- Bureau des grands projets

Office overview
- Formed: August 29, 2025
- Jurisdiction: Government of Canada
- Headquarters: Calgary, Alberta
- Minister responsible: Dominic LeBlanc, President of the King's Privy Council for Canada and Minister responsible for Canada-U.S. Trade, Intergovernmental Affairs and One Canadian Economy
- Office executive: Dawn L. Farrell, Chief Executive Officer
- Parent department: Privy Council Office
- Key document: Building Canada Act
- Website: www.canada.ca/en/privy-council/major-projects-office.html

The Major Projects Office (MPO; French: Bureau des grands projets; BGP) is an organization formed to coordinate and streamline the financing and federal regulatory approval process for "national interest projects" designated by the Government of Canada.

== Role and background ==
Headquartered in Calgary, Alberta, the office was established in 2025 by Prime Minister Mark Carney's government. The Building Canada Act allows the government to designate major infrastructure projects to be of "national interest", before consulting with regulatory departments, Indigenous peoples, provinces and territories, and other stakeholders to consolidate regulatory conditions into a single document. Dawn Farrell has been chief executive officer of the MPO since it was formed in August 2025. Privy Council President and One Canadian Economy Minister Dominic LeBlanc is the minister responsible for the Building Canada Act and the office. The office absorbed the Clean Growth Office, which was launched in July 2024.

=== Background ===
In April 2025, ahead of the 2025 Canadian federal election, the Liberal Party announced plans to introduce legislation to speed up the delivery of major infrastructure projects in Canada, in response to the 2025 United States trade war with Canada and Mexico. The Building Canada Act, allows Cabinet to declare an infrastructure project to be in the "national interest". Once this designation is made, all findings and determinations needed under any Act of Parliament to authorize the project are deemed to have been made. The minister responsible for the Act can then issue the proponent a single document authorizing the project. This replaces all other permits required, and sets out the conditions under which the project may be built. The Cabinet is also given broad power to issue regulations exempting the project from other laws. Though, as a result of amendments made by committee, this power does not extend to some enumerated Acts, like the Criminal Code and the Hazardous Products Act. Before a project is declared to be in the national interest, the Act requires the minister to consider relevant factors. The act enumerates some factors to this end, though it doesn't mandate them. These include, whether the project will strengthen the country's "autonomy, resilience and security", whether it will provide economic or non-economic benefits to Canada, whether the project is highly likely to be successfully executed, if it advances the interests of Indigenous peoples, and if it helps Canada meet its climate change and energy transition objectives. The Act also requires the minister to consult with Indigenous peoples whenever making a national interest designation, and whenever issuing or amending an authorizing document. The Act has a sunset clause of five years, after which new projects cannot be designated.

In July 2025, the Liberal prime minister Mark Carney convened a meeting with members of the Inuit-Crown Partnership Committee to hear Indigenous concerns regarding the legislation. He also convened the Métis Major Projects Summit on August 7.

== Projects ==
=== Pacific Link ===
On October 1, 2026, the MPO classified the Pacific Link pipeline as a national interest project under schedule 1 of the Building Canada Act. Pacific Link is the first project to have received this designation.
