= Minister of Internal Trade (Canada) =

Minister in the Cabinet of Canada

- Ministre du commerce intérieur
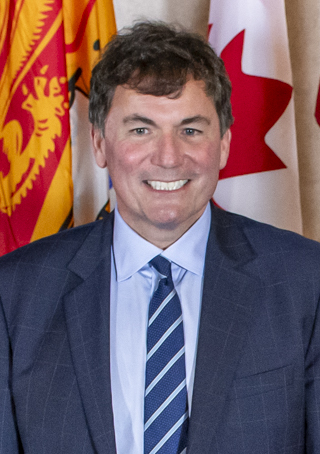
- Incumbent; Dominic LeBlanc since September 16, 2025
- Inaugural holder: Mauril Bélanger
- Formation: May 17, 2005

The Minister of Internal Trade (French: ministre du commerce intérieur) is a member of the Cabinet of Canada. The minister can be appointed under the Agreement on Internal Trade Implementation Act of 1996. However, the position was not used until 2005, and it was disused during several periods of time thereafter. In the absence of a Minister of Internal Trade, the Minister of Industry was responsible for the administration of the act.

== Ministers ==
Key:

Liberal Party of Canada
Conservative Party of Canada

No.	Portrait	Name	Term of office		Political party	Ministry	Notes	ref
1		Mauril Bélanger	May 17, 2005	February 6, 2006	Liberal	27 (Martin)	While Deputy Leader of the Government in the House of Commons	
Vacant						28 (Harper)		
Vacant						29 (J. Trudeau)		
2		Dominic LeBlanc	July 18, 2018	November 20, 2019	Liberal	29 (J. Trudeau)	While Minister of Intergovernmental Affairs	
Vacant						29 (J. Trudeau)		
3		Anita Anand	December 20, 2024	March 14, 2025	Liberal	29 (J. Trudeau)	While Minister of Transport	
4		Chrystia Freeland	March 14, 2025	September 16, 2025	Liberal	30 (Carney)	While Minister of Transport	
(2)		Dominic LeBlanc	September 16, 2025	Incumbent	Liberal	30 (Carney)	While Minister responsible for Canada-U.S. Trade, Intergovernmental Affairs and One Canadian Economy and President of the King's Privy Council for Canada	

== See also ==
- Agreement on Internal Trade
- European Commissioner for Internal Market and Services
- Directorate-General for Internal Market and Services (European Commission)
