= Minister responsible for Canada-U.S. Trade, Intergovernmental Affairs and One Canadian Economy =

Canadian cabinet position

- Ministre responsable du Commerce Canada–États-Unis, des Affaires intergouvernementales et de l’Unité de l’économie canadienne
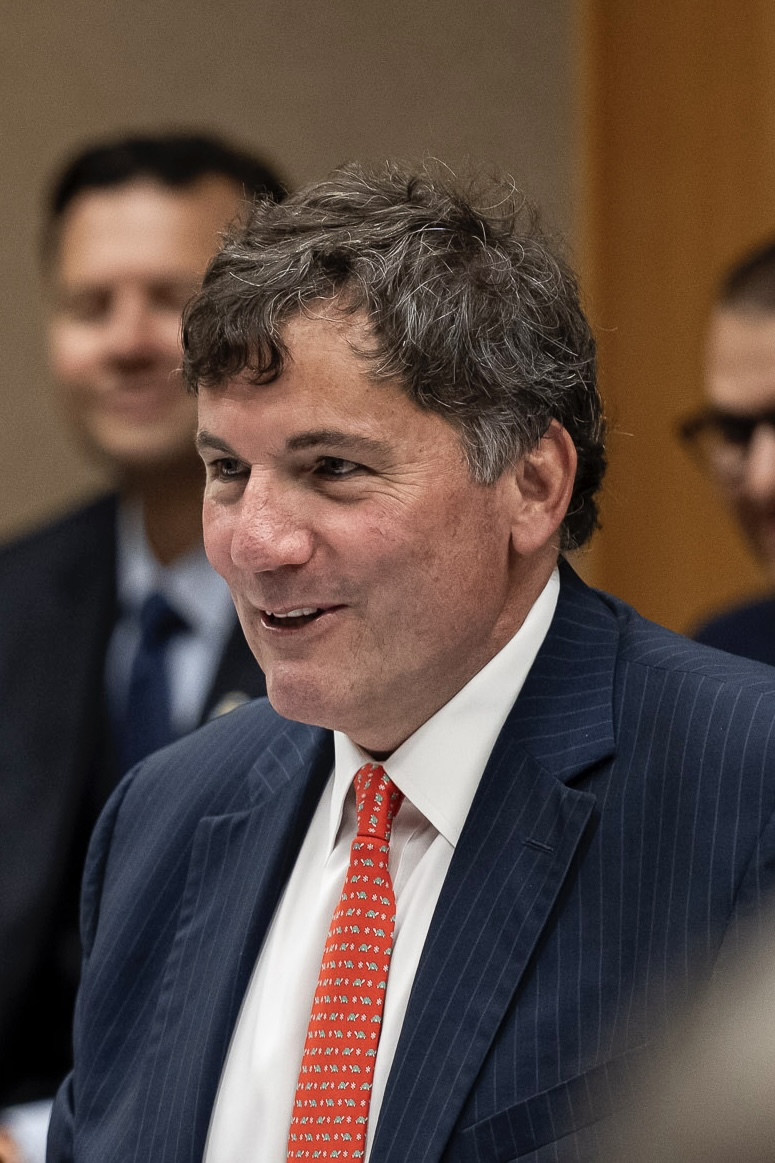
- Incumbent; Dominic LeBlanc since May 13, 2025
- Global Affairs Canada; Privy Council Office (Intergovernmental Affairs Secretariat)
- Style: The Honourable
- Member of: Parliament; Privy Council; Cabinet
- Reports to: Parliament; Prime Minister
- Appointer: Monarch (represented by the governor general); on the advice of the prime minister
- Term length: At His Majesty's pleasure
- Salary: CA$299,900 (2024)

The minister responsible for Canada-U.S. trade, intergovernmental affairs and one Canadian economy (Note: French: ministre responsable du commerce Canada–États-Unis, des affaires intergouvernementales et de l’unité de l’économie canadienne) is a minister of the Crown with a multi-role portfolio in the Canadian Cabinet. Supported by Global Affairs Canada, the minister manages trade negotiations with the United States and the overall bilateral trade relationship. The minister oversees federal relations with provinces and territories, and directs the Intergovernmental Affairs Secretariat in the Privy Council Office as minister of intergovernmental affairs.

Dominic LeBlanc has held the role since it was created on May 13, 2025, and concurrently serves as the president of the King's Privy Council for Canada. LeBlanc has held the intergovernmental affairs portfolio since 2020 and previously from 2018 to 2019. The minister is selected by the prime minister and appointed by the Crown.

== History ==
The role was created in May 2025 by Prime Minister Mark Carney following the 2025 federal election. Before the election, Dominic LeBlanc served as minister of international trade and minister of public safety, where he developed a relationship with U.S. commerce secretary Howard Lutnick and President Donald Trump. The role was introduced in the context of the trade war with the United States, it has since been described as one of the most important posts in government. Amid increasing calls for diversification and self-reliance, a renewed focus emerged on reducing Canada's interprovincial trade barriers—a longstanding irritant in Canadian federalism—and the need to build nation-building megaprojects.

=== Legislation ===
In June 2025, Minister LeBlanc introduced bill C-5, the One Canadian Economy Act, which received Royal assent on June 26 and contains the Free Trade and Labour Mobility in Canada Act and the Building Canada Act. The legislation seeks to reduce internal trade barriers in Canada and allows a designated minister to expedite nation-building initiatives.

== List of ministers ==
Key:

Liberal Party of Canada

Minister responsible for Canada-U.S. Trade, Intergovernmental Affairs and One Canadian Economy
No.	Portrait	Minister	Term of office		Political party	Ministry
1		Dominic LeBlanc	May 13, 2025	Incumbent	Liberal	30th (Carney)
