= Pacific Link pipeline =

Oil pipeline in Canada

Pacific Link (West Coast Oil Pipeline)

Location
- Country: Canada
- Province: Alberta; British Columbia
- Start: Edmonton, Alberta (Bruderheim)
- To: Delta, British Columbia (Roberts Bank Superport)
- Runs alongside: Trans Mountain Pipeline System

General information
- Type: Heavy crude oil
- Status: Proposed
- Owner: Alberta Petroleum Marketing Commission (45%); Trans Mountain Corporation (45%); Pembina Pipeline Corporation (10%)
- Expected: 2027 (construction); 2032 or 2033 (operation)

Technical information
- Length: 1,250 km (780 mi)
- Maximum discharge: ~1,000,000 barrels per day (160,000 m^{3}/d)
- No. of pumping stations: 11
- Website: Government of Alberta; Major Projects Office

Pacific Link is a proposed heavy crude oil pipeline in Canada. Previously known as the West Coast Oil Pipeline (WCOP; French: Oléoduc vers la côte ouest), the proposal would see the construction of a pipeline along a corridor which largely aligns with the route of the existing Trans Mountain Pipeline System from Edmonton, Alberta, to Delta, British Columbia. The pipeline is expected to be completed in 2032 or 2033 and cost $35.2 to $43.7 billion. In 2026, the federal government's Major Projects Office (MPO) designated Pacific Link as a national interest project.

== Project description ==
The Government of Alberta's submission to the MPO outlines plans for a pipeline up to approximately 1,250 kilometres in length using much of the existing Trans Mountain Pipeline System right-of-way, originating in Alberta in Bruderheim, near Edmonton, to Roberts Bank Superport in Delta, British Columbia. The route would include 11 pump stations, and a receipt station would be constructed in Bruderheim as well as delivery tanks terminal and offshore marine loading facilities with capacity for very large crude carriers. The pipeline would add roughly one million barrels per day (MMb/d) of capacity.

=== Ownership ===
The pipeline will be co-owned by the Government of Alberta through the Alberta Petroleum Marketing Commission, the Government of Canada through the Crown corporation Canada Development Investment Corporation and its subsidiary Trans Mountain Corporation, and the Pembina Pipeline Corporation. The governments of Alberta and Canada will hold an equal share of 45 per cent and Pembina will own 10 per cent through construction, with the opportunity to add up to 10 per cent once the pipeline is operative. Through Indigenous loan guarantee programs, Indigenous communities will also be offered a minimum of 10 per cent ownership interest.

== Economic impact ==
A report from the Toronto-Dominion Bank described the proposed pipeline as "transformative in scale", adding roughly one MMb/d of capacity which would increase Canada's crude oil export capacity by nearly 20 per cent and double export capacity to overseas markets in Asia. As a result of construction, the Alberta government estimates that spending for the pipeline and upstream activity could generate $70 billion to $81 billion in economic activity between 2026 and 2038, increasing Canada's gross domestic product by 0.4 per cent.
