= Protect Ontario by Unleashing our Economy Act =

Ontario provincial legislation

Protect Ontario by Unleashing our Economy Act, 2025

Legislative Assembly of Ontario
- Citation: S.O. 2025, c. 4
- Assented to: 2025-06-05

Legislative history
- Bill citation: Bill 5
- Introduced by: Stephen Lecce MPP, Minister of Energy and Mines
- First reading: 2025-04-17
- Second reading: 2025-04-29 - 2025-06-04
- Third reading: 2025-06-04

Related legislation
- One Canadian Economy Act
- Status: Current legislation

The Protect Ontario by Unleashing our Economy Act, 2025 (French: Loi de 2025 pour protéger l’Ontario en libérant son économie) is an act of the Legislative Assembly of Ontario. It is sponsored by Stephen Lecce.

== Legislative passage ==
Liberal MPPs tabled 4,022 amendments to the bill in the committee stage.

== Provisions ==
=== Special Economic Zones Act ===
The act allows the establishment of special economic zones by provincial government ministers, by enacting the Special Economic Zones Act. These zones would be exempt from certain provincial regulations and municipal by-laws.

=== Amendments to the Mining Act ===
The approval process under the provincial Mining Act is shortened from 4 years to 2 years.

=== Endangered Species Act ===
The provincial Endangered Species Act is replaced with significantly weaker rules. For example, a Caribou habitat is restricted to just a calving site, according to Canada's National Observer.

=== Ontario Place ===
The provincial government would be exempted from providing public notice of changes to the Ontario Place redevelopment project.

=== Expansion of landfill near Dresden ===
The act approves the proposal for an expansion of a waste-disposal facility near Dresden in southwestern Ontario.

== Criticism ==
Several Treaty 9 First Nations criticized the legislation, saying they would go to court to challenge it, due to the fact that the Ring of Fire area was announced to be the first special economic zone.

The MPP whose riding contains the landfill near Dresden, Steve Pinsonneault, said that he did not support the expansion.

== Other developments ==
Soon after the legislation received royal assent, the Premier, Doug Ford, said that he would be happy to give First Nations in the province what they wanted in return for their support in developing mines. Ford also said that First Nations should not be able to "keep coming hat in hand all the time to the government" for more money. The next day, Ford apologised for his remarks, saying "I sincerely apologize for my words — not only if it hurt all the chiefs in that room, but all First Nations."

== See also ==
- One Canadian Economy Act
