= One Canadian Economy Act =

Canadian federal legislation

Parliament of Canada
- Long title: An Act to enact the Free Trade and Labour Mobility in Canada Act and the Building Canada Act
- Citation: One Canadian Economy Act, S.C. 2025, c. 2
- Enacted by: House of Commons
- Enacted by: Senate
- Royal assent: June 26, 2025

Legislative history

Initiating chamber: House of Commons
- Bill citation: Bill C-5
- Introduced by: Dominic LeBlanc, Minister responsible for Canada-U.S. Trade, Intergovernmental Affairs and One Canadian Economy
- First reading: June 6, 2025
- Second reading: June 16, 2025
- Considered in committee: June 17–18, 2025
- Third reading: June 20, 2025

Revising chamber: Senate
- Member(s) in charge: Patti LaBoucane-Benson, Legislative Deputy to the Government Representative in the Senate
- First reading: June 25, 2025
- Second reading: June 25, 2025
- Third reading: June 26, 2025
- Passed: June 26, 2025
- Status: In force

The One Canadian Economy Act (French: Loi sur l’unité de l’économie canadienne), introduced as Bill C-5, was enacted by the Parliament of Canada with the objective of reducing interprovincial trade barriers and expediting the construction of major infrastructure projects. The legislation was introduced by the government of Mark Carney, and was a response to the 2025 trade war with the United States.

The bill contains two distinct Acts, based on two different pledges made by Carney in his campaign for the 2025 federal election. Part 1 enacts the Free Trade and Labour Mobility in Canada Act, acting on a commitment to eliminate all federal barriers to interprovincial trade by Canada Day. Part 2 enacts the Building Canada Act, upholding Carney's pledge to facilitate the construction of nation-building infrastructure megaprojects. The bill was unveiled by the Carney government as one of its first initiatives following the election, and passed on an expedited timeframe with the support of the Conservative Party.

== Background ==
During the presidency of Donald Trump, the United States initiated a trade war with Canada. This conflict was perceived as posing a major threat to the economy of Canada, and led to a focus on the country's reliance on the United States for trade. Amid increasing calls for diversification and self-reliance, politicians and analysts stressed the urgency of reducing Canada's interprovincial trade barriers—a longstanding irritant and a quirk of Canadian federalism. The crisis also led to a focus on the need to build nation-building megaprojects.

On March 14, 2025, Mark Carney was sworn in as Prime Minister, after winning the 2025 Liberal leadership election. Carney proposed several measures to strengthen Canada's economy in response to the trade war, including eliminating all federal barriers to trade and labour mobility by Canada Day. He also placed an emphasis on infrastructure, stating "It is high time to build things that we never imagined, and to build them at a speed that we have never seen".

Carney subsequently advised the Governor General to dissolve parliament, triggering a snap election. The reduction of interprovincial trade barriers and the construction of infrastructure megaprojects were a major theme of both the Liberal and Conservative campaigns. Carney's Liberals won a minority government, and presented Bill C-5 within days of recalling Parliament. The bill was presented in tandem with efforts by provincial governments to lift barriers within their jurisdiction.

== Provisions ==
=== Part I: Free Trade and Labour Mobility in Canada Act ===
The legislation focuses on lifting federal restrictions to interprovincial trade. Under the Act, whenever a good or service is produced or distributed while meeting the standards of its originating province or territory, it is automatically deemed to meet any equivalent federal standard. The Act also requires the federal government to recognize the licenses and accelerations conferred by a province or territory to a worker within its jurisdiction, eliminating duplicative requirements. Under the Act, a federal standard is considered equivalent to a provincial/territorial standard if it relates to the same aspect of a good or service, and it is intended to achieve a similar objective. The statute also gives Cabinet the power to make regulations creating exceptions to this regime.

=== Part II: Building Canada Act ===
This Act allows Cabinet to declare an infrastructure project to be in the "national interest". Once this designation is made, all findings and determinations needed under any Act of Parliament to authorize the project are deemed to have been made. The Minister responsible for the Act can then issue the proponent a single document authorizing the project. This replaces all other permits required, and sets out the conditions under which the project may be built. The Cabinet is also given broad power to issue regulations exempting the project from other laws. Though, as a result of amendments made by committee, this power does not extend to some enumerated Acts, like the Criminal Code and the Hazardous Products Act.

Before a project is declared to be in the national interest, the Act requires the Minister to consider relevant factors. The act enumerates some factors to this end, though it doesn't mandate them. These include, whether the project will strengthen the country's "autonomy, resilience and security", whether it will provide economic or non-economic benefits to Canada, whether the project is highly likely to be successfully executed, if it advances the interests of indigenous peoples, and if it helps Canada meet its Climate Change and energy transition objectives. The Act also requires the Minister to consult with indigenous peoples whenever making a national interest designation, and whenever issuing or amending an authorizing document. The Act also has a sunset clause of five years, after which new projects cannot be designated.

The Act mandated a Parliamentary Review Committee to provide oversight of the law's use, and the Special Joint Committee on the Exercise of Powers Under the Building Canada Act was constituted for this purpose.

== Legislative history ==
After introducing the bill, the Liberals proposed a motion to fast-track it, so it could pass on an expedited schedule before Parliament rose for its summer recess. The motion limited debate on the bill, so that only two members of every party with official status, along with one member each from the New Democratic Party (NDP) and the Green Party, could speak on the bill, per stage. Consideration of the bill by committee was also proposed to be limited to two days. The motion was approved by the House of Commons on June 16, with the Conservatives backing it. All other opposition parties—The Bloc Québécois, the NDP, and the Green Party—opposed the plan. The bill passed second reading, and was referred to committee on the same day, with the same parties supporting and opposing it. The bill was studied by the standing committee on Transport, Infrastructure, and Communities, on June 17 and 18, being approved shortly after midnight on the second day, with some amendments. The bill passed third reading on the June 20, the final sitting day of the House of Commons before its summer recess.

As with the House of Commons, the government expedited the bill in the Senate through a programming motion. Under the adopted rules, the Senate undertook a pre-study before the House approved the bill—replacing the committee process. The motion also limited debate by requiring all votes on the bill to occur no later than June 27. The Senate passed the bill on first and second reading on June 25. Some Senators objected to this expedited process, and attempted to slow down the bill through amendments, but these were rejected. On June 26, the bill was approved by the Senate on third reading. The bill received royal assent on the same day, becoming law.

== Reception ==
The Building Canada Act — contained in Part 2 of the bill – has received substantial criticism from Indigenous groups. On the same day the bill was tabled, the Assembly of First Nations announced a meeting of chiefs to coordinate a response to it. Indigenous groups accused the government of wanting to give itself the power to "bulldoze" their rights, and have questioned the pretense it has been passed under. Another point of criticism is the fact that the government only gave them a week to review the bill before introducing it. The bill has also been linked to legislation enacted by the Ford government in Ontario, which was passed earlier in the year against indigenous opposition, also with the purpose of responding to the trade war and expediting the development of infrastructure projects. The Nishnawbe Aski Nation, a group of 49 First Nations in northern Ontario, warned both governments of a "long, hot summer" if the bills were not withdrawn. The bill also received criticism for the new powers that it gives Cabinet.

The Act has also received criticism from environmental groups, including Ecojustice and West Coast Environmental Law. Progressive politicians likened Carney to Conservative Prime Minister Stephen Harper, for his purported disregard for the environment. NDP MP Alexandre Boulerice described the fast-tracking provisions as "Harper’s dreams coming true", while Liberal MP Nathaniel Erskine-Smith—the sole member of the Liberal caucus to vote against the bill—said the Act would "make Harper blush". Carney rejected the comparisons, saying that the measures and the expedited passage of the bill were justified in the context of the economic emergency facing Canada. He also announced summits with indigenous groups over the summer to address their concerns.

The Building Canada Act has received support from business associations and some trade unions, who highlighted the impact of long approval times for projects under Canada's existing regime. Sean Strickland, the director of an association representing 14 unions in construction, maintenance and fabrication, urged all parties to quickly to adopt the bill, stressing the serious consequences for trades workers due to the economic effects of American tariffs. Additionally, the Canadian Chamber of Commerce applauded the bill, saying that it "rises to meet the moment" of the trade war. The Free Trade and Labour Mobility in Canada Act has also been much less controversial than part 2, with most opposition parties supporting it.

== See also ==
- Protect Ontario by Unleashing our Economy Act
- Protect Ontario Through Free Trade Within Canada Act
- Major Projects Office
