= Minister responsible for Constitutional Affairs =

Minister responsible for Constitutional Affairs of Canada
- Member of: Cabinet of Canada
- Formation: April 21, 1991
- Abolished: June 24, 1993
- Unofficial names: Unity minister

The Minister responsible for Constitutional Affairs was the Canadian cabinet minister responsible for constitutional affairs during the preparation for the attempted Charlottetown Accord constitutional amendments. The position was created on April 21, 1991, following the failure of the Meech Lake Accord and was abolished June 24, 1993 following the failure of the Charlottetown Accord.

Joe Clark was the only person to hold this post, and Brian Mulroney was the only prime minister to assign a Cabinet minister in this area.

The position was sometimes informally called "unity minister" in sources such as media accounts. This same informal appellation was given to the subsequent position Minister of Intergovernmental Affairs.
