= Dominic LeBlanc =

Canadian politician (born 1967)

The Honourable Dominic LeBlanc PC KC MP
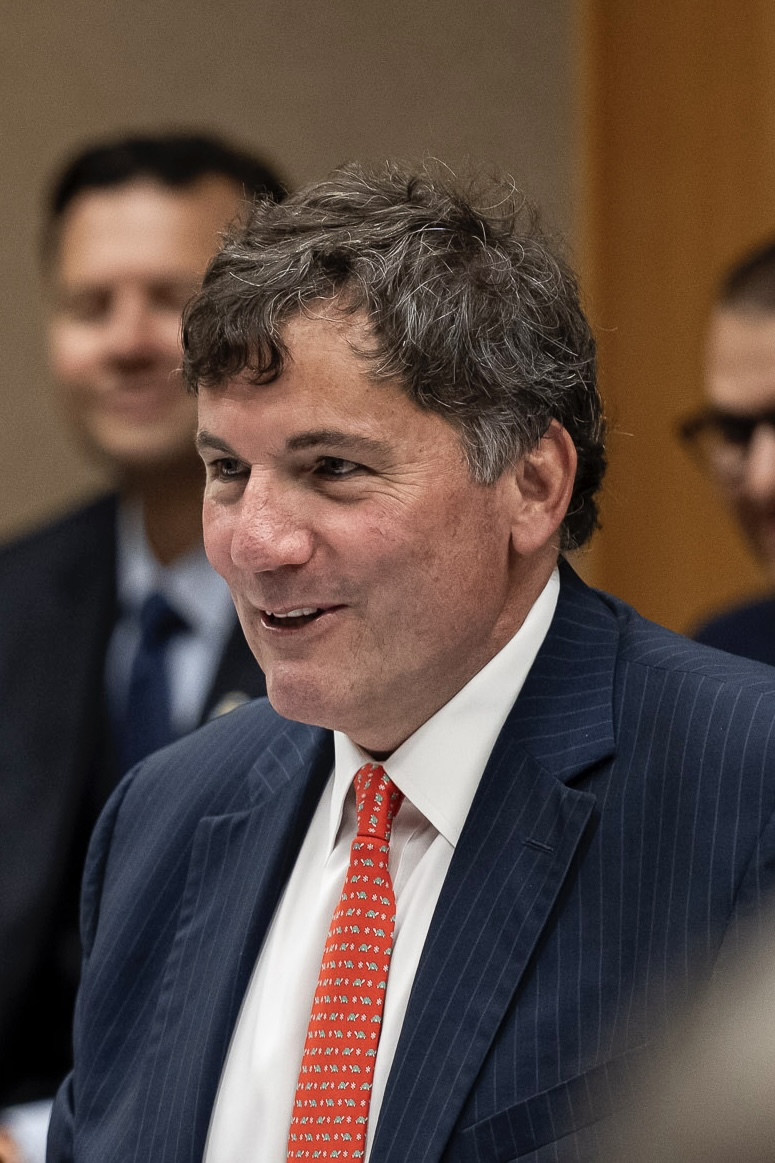
- LeBlanc in 2024

Minister of Internal Trade
- Incumbent
- Assumed office September 16, 2025
- Prime Minister: Mark Carney
- Preceded by: Chrystia Freeland (Transport and Internal Trade)

President of the King's Privy Council for Canada (Note: Stylized as President of the Queen's Privy Council for Canada from 2018 to 2021)
- Incumbent
- Assumed office March 14, 2025
- Monarch: Charles III
- Prime Minister: Mark Carney
- Preceded by: Harjit Sajjan
- In office July 18, 2018 – October 26, 2021
- Monarch: Elizabeth II
- Prime Minister: Justin Trudeau
- Preceded by: Karina Gould
- Succeeded by: Bill Blair

Minister responsible for Canada-U.S. Trade, Intergovernmental Affairs and One Canadian Economy
- Incumbent
- Assumed office May 13, 2025 (Note: LeBlanc has held the Intergovernmental Affairs portfolio under various titles since July 18, 2020, and from July 18, 2018 to November 20, 2019.)
Other offices held
| Prime Minister | Mark Carney |
Minister of International Trade and Intergovernmental Affairs
In office March 14, 2025 – May 13, 2025
| Prime Minister | Mark Carney |
| Preceded by | Mary Ng (Trade); Himself (Intergovernmental Affairs) |
| Succeeded by | Maninder Sidhu (Trade); Himself (Intergovernmental Affairs (Note: As Minister responsible for Canada-U.S. Trade, Intergovernmental Affairs and One Canadian Economy)) |
Minister of Intergovernmental Affairs
In office December 20, 2024 – March 13, 2025
| Prime Minister | Justin Trudeau |
| Preceded by | Himself (Note: As Minister of Public Safety, Democratic Institutions and Intergovernmental Affairs) |
| Succeeded by | Himself (Note: As Minister of International Trade and Intergovernmental Affairs) |
In office August 18, 2020 – October 26, 2021
| Prime Minister | Justin Trudeau |
| Preceded by | Chrystia Freeland |
| Succeeded by | Himself (Note: As Minister of Intergovernmental Affairs, Infrastructure and Communities) |
Minister of Finance
In office December 16, 2024 – March 14, 2025
| Prime Minister | Justin Trudeau |
| Preceded by | Chrystia Freeland |
| Succeeded by | François-Philippe Champagne |
Minister of Public Safety, Democratic Institutions and Intergovernmental Affairs
In office July 26, 2023 – December 20, 2024
| Prime Minister | Justin Trudeau |
| Preceded by | Marco Mendicino (Public Safety); Karina Gould (Democratic Institutions; 2019); Himself (Note: As Minister of Intergovernmental Affairs, Infrastructure and Communities) |
| Succeeded by | David McGuinty (Public Safety); Ruby Sahota (Democratic Institutions; 2019); Himself (Intergovernmental Affairs (Note: As Minister of Public Safety, Democratic Institutions and Intergovernmental Affairs)) |
Minister of Intergovernmental Affairs, Infrastructure and Communities
In office October 26, 2021 – July 26, 2023
| Prime Minister | Justin Trudeau |
| Preceded by | Catherine McKenna (Infrastructure and Communities); Himself (Intergovernmental Affairs) |
| Succeeded by | Sean Fraser (Infrastructure and Communities); Himself (Intergovernmental Affairs (Note: As Minister of Public Safety, Democratic Institutions and Intergovernmental Affairs)) |
Minister of Intergovernmental Affairs, Northern Affairs and Internal Trade
In office July 18, 2018 – November 20, 2019
| Prime Minister | Justin Trudeau |
| Preceded by | Justin Trudeau (Intergovernmental Affairs); Carolyn Bennett (Northern Affairs); Mauril Bélanger (Internal Trade; 2006) |
| Succeeded by | Christya Freeland (Intergovernmental Affairs); Dan Vandal (Northern Affairs); Anita Anand (Internal Trade; 2024) |
Minister of Fisheries, Oceans and the Canadian Coast Guard
In office May 31, 2016 – July 18, 2018
| Prime Minister | Justin Trudeau |
| Preceded by | Hunter Tootoo |
| Succeeded by | Jonathan Wilkinson |
Government House Leader
In office November 4, 2015 – August 19, 2016
| Prime Minister | Justin Trudeau |
| Preceded by | Peter Van Loan |
| Succeeded by | Bardish Chagger |

Member of Parliament for Beauséjour
- Incumbent
- Assumed office November 27, 2000
- Preceded by: Angela Vautour

Personal details
- Born: December 14, 1967 (age 58) Ottawa, Ontario, Canada
- Party: Liberal
- Spouse: Jolène Richard
- Parent: Roméo LeBlanc
- Education: Lisgar Collegiate Institute
- Alma mater: University of Toronto (BA); University of New Brunswick (LLB); Harvard University (LLM)
- Profession: Lawyer
- Website: dominicleblanc.libparl.ca

Dominic A. LeBlanc (born December 14, 1967) is a Canadian lawyer and politician who serves as President of the King's Privy Council for Canada, Minister responsible for Canada-U.S. Trade, Intergovernmental Affairs and One Canadian Economy, and Minister of Internal Trade. A member of the Liberal Party, LeBlanc is the member of Parliament (MP) for Beauséjour since 2000. He has held several Cabinet portfolios throughout his tenure in government as LeBlanc is often described as a political "fixer," frequently appointed to departments in need of stabilization or facing controversy. His retention and promotion under both Justin Trudeau and Mark Carney have been noted as evidence of his cross-factional credibility and role as a steadying force in Cabinet.

The son of former governor general Roméo LeBlanc, he ran for the leadership of the Liberal Party in 2008 but dropped out of the race to endorse Michael Ignatieff, who was later acclaimed leader.

In the cabinet of Prime Minister Justin Trudeau, LeBlanc served as the leader of the Government in the House of Commons from 2015 to 2016. He served as Minister of Fisheries, Oceans and the Canadian Coast Guard from 2016 to 2018 and Minister of Intergovernmental Affairs, Northern Affairs and Internal Trade from 2018 to 2019. He also served as President of the Queen's Privy Council for Canada from 2018 to 2021 and began a second stint as Minister of Intergovernmental Affairs in 2020. After the 2021 federal election, LeBlanc remained as minister of intergovernmental affairs but additionally became minister of infrastructure and communities. In 2023, LeBlanc became Minister of Public Safety, Democratic Institutions and Intergovernmental Affairs, gaining responsibility for public safety and democratic institutions while remaining minister of intergovernmental affairs. In December 2024, following the resignation of Chrystia Freeland, LeBlanc became Minister of Finance and he gave up the responsibility for Public Safety and Democratic Institutions while keeping Intergovernmental Affairs and the border security portfolio.

== Early life and education ==
LeBlanc was born in 1967, of Acadian descent, at the Ottawa Civic Hospital in Ottawa, Ontario, to Joslyn "Lyn" (née Carter) and Roméo LeBlanc, a former MP, senator and 25th governor general of Canada. At the time, his father was press secretary to Prime Minister Lester B. Pearson.

As a child, he baby-sat the children of then-prime minister Pierre Trudeau, including Justin Trudeau. He remained friends with Justin Trudeau and endorsed Trudeau's candidacy for Liberal leader in 2012.

LeBlanc attended Lisgar Collegiate Institute in Ottawa for high school. He earned a Bachelor of Arts degree in political science from the University of Toronto (Trinity College) and a Bachelor of Laws degree from the University of New Brunswick, and then attended Harvard Law School, where he obtained his Master of Laws degree. LeBlanc worked as a barrister and solicitor with Clark Drummie in Shediac and Moncton. From 1993 to 1996, LeBlanc was a Special Advisor to Prime Minister Jean Chrétien.

== Political career (1997–present) ==
LeBlanc is member of the Liberal Party of Canada in the House of Commons of Canada, representing the riding of Beauséjour in New Brunswick.

LeBlanc first ran for election in that riding in 1997, losing to New Democratic Party candidate Angela Vautour. During that race there were accusations of political patronage as LeBlanc's father was the sitting viceroy, and there was criticism that the governor general had a series of events planned in New Brunswick during the week that the election writs dropped.

In 2000 LeBlanc once again ran against Vautour, who had crossed the floor to join the Progressive Conservative party, and was elected. LeBlanc was re-elected in 2004 (where he faced Vautour for a third time), 2006, 2008, 2011, 2015, 2019, and 2021.

=== Chrétien and Martin governments ===
During the Liberal Party's time in power LeBlanc served as Parliamentary Secretary to the Minister of National Defence, from January 13, 2003, to December 11, 2003, and was the chair of the Atlantic Caucus.

On July 10, 2004, he was sworn in as a member of the Privy Council for Canada and appointed Parliamentary Secretary to the leader of the Government in the House of Commons and Deputy Chief Government Whip. He has served on the Special Committee on Non-Medical Use of Drugs, and the Standing Committees on Fisheries and Oceans, Transport and Government Operations, National Defence and Veterans Affairs, Public Accounts, Procedures and House Affairs, International Trade, and Justice and Human Rights.

=== In opposition ===
In January 2006, he was named Official Opposition critic for international trade and later that year he was co-chair of the 2006 Liberal Party leadership convention in Montreal. In January 2007, he was named by the Honourable Stéphane Dion, Vice Chair – Liberal Party of Canada Policy and Platform Committee and In October of that year, he was named Official Opposition critic for intergovernmental affairs. In January 2009, he was named by Michael Ignatieff as the critic for justice and attorney general. Before the return of Parliament in September 2010, Ignatieff shuffled his Shadow Cabinet and appointed LeBlanc as the Liberal critic for national defence. Following LeBlanc's re-election in the 2011 federal election, interim Liberal leader Bob Rae appointed LeBlanc as the Liberal Party's foreign affairs critic.

==== 2008 leadership bid ====
On October 27, 2008, LeBlanc was the first candidate to officially announce his intention to seek the leadership of the Liberal party to replace Stéphane Dion. Former leadership candidates Michael Ignatieff and Bob Rae came forward shortly after LeBlanc's announcement. His supporters included top staffers in the prime minister's office under Jean Chrétien, such as his former chief of staff Percy Downe, and Tim Murphy, chief of staff under Paul Martin. Some senior organizers in Gerard Kennedy's 2006 leadership bid also supported LeBlanc.

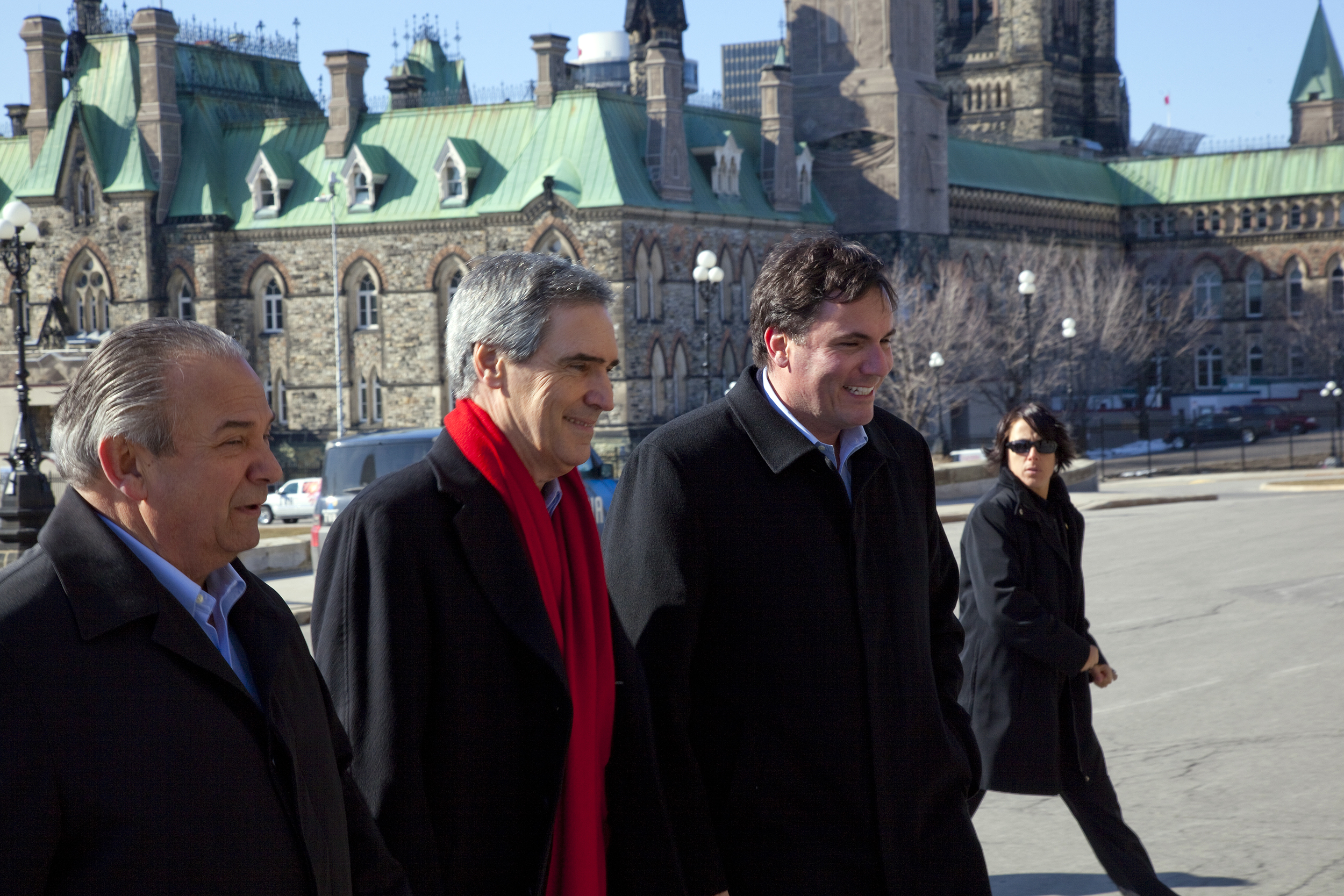
LeBlanc with Liberal leader Michael Ignatieff (centre-left) during the 2011 federal election campaign launch, in Ottawa.

On December 8, 2008, LeBlanc announced he was dropping out of the leadership race because he felt a new leader needed to be in place as soon as possible and that he was throwing his support behind Ignatieff. The next day Rae dropped out of the race and Ignatieff was acclaimed leader when Dion stepped down.

==== 41st Canadian Parliament ====
LeBlanc retained his seat in the 2011 election, the only Liberal to be elected in New Brunswick, while the Liberals dropped down to third place in the House of Commons.

Following Ignatieff's resignation as leader, LeBlanc was seen as a potential leadership candidate. LeBlanc did not say whether he was considering a bid but hoped to be part of the "rebuilding and renewal" of the party. Later, LeBlanc said that the next leader needs to commit 10 to 15 years of his or her life "occupied exclusively" with rebuilding the Liberal party and winning elections. On October 5, 2012, he announced he would not stand for the leadership and instead endorsed Justin Trudeau.

From 2012 to 2015, LeBlanc served as the Liberal opposition house leader.

=== In government ===
==== 42nd Canadian Parliament ====
===== Leader of the Government in the House of Commons =====
On November 4, 2015, he was appointed the leader of the Government in the House of Commons in the present Cabinet, headed by Justin Trudeau.

As Government House Leader, LeBlanc was an ex officio member of the Board of Internal Economy, a committee of Members of Parliament chaired by the Speaker of the House of Commons who oversees the internal affairs of the House of Commons. He had previously been a member of committee as the Liberal Party’s House Leader while in opposition from 2012 to 2015, and continued to serve on the Board until October 26, 2023.

During his tenure as House Leader, LeBlanc introduced Bill C-22, which created the National Security and Intelligence Committee of Parliamentarians, a committee composed of Members of Parliament and Senators equipped with top-secret security clearances and with a mandate to conduct oversight of the work of Canada’s national security and intelligence community. The committee is the first body of its kind in Canada, offering parliamentarians an unprecedented view into highly classified intelligence and activities conducted by the Canadian Security Intelligence Service (CSIS), the Communications Security Establishment (CSE), the Royal Canadian Mounted Police (RCMP) and Global Affairs Canada. It produces classified and unclassified reports which are shared with the Prime Minister. The classified version of the report is subsequently tabled in Parliament and released publicly.

===== Minister of Fisheries, Oceans and the Canadian Coast Guard =====
On May 31, 2016, upon the resignation of Hunter Tootoo from the Ministry, LeBlanc was named Minister of Fisheries, Oceans and the Canadian Coast Guard. His father had previously held the equivalent position under Prime Minister Pierre Trudeau. He retained the post of Government House Leader until August 19 of that year.

During his tenure as Minister of Fisheries and Oceans, LeBlanc modernized the Fisheries Act, strengthening the provisions contained in the legislation regarding the protection of fish stocks and fish habitat. He also introduced legislation amending the Oceans Act and the Canada Petroleum Resources Act to establish a national network of Marine Protected Areas, a novel type of conservation measure in Canada. Since then, 14 Oceans Act Marine Protected Areas (MPAs) have been established across Canada, comprising over 350,000 km² or roughly 6% of Canada’s marine and coastal areas, contributing to Canada’s goal of protecting 30% of its marine areas by 2030, in accordance with its international commitments.

LeBlanc’s tenure was also marked by heightened concerns regarding the entanglement of North Atlantic Right Whales, an endangered species, in fishing gear, leading to the death of several cetaceans. In response, LeBlanc engaged with industry groups, Indigenous communities and United States fishing authorities to develop new fishing gear and implement seasonal restrictions to maritime traffic to reduce the risk of entanglement and collisions.

On September 12, 2018, the ethics commissioner, Mario Dion, found LeBlanc broke conflict of interest rules when he awarded a lucrative Arctic surf clam licence to a company linked to his wife's cousin in February 2018.

LeBlanc was also a lead minister behind the Atlantic Growth Strategy, an intergovernmental forum comprising all four Atlantic premiers and all Atlantic federal ministers launched on July 4, 2016. The Strategy’s goal is to attract newcomers and investment to Atlantic Canada by enabling collaboration between the federal government and Atlantic provinces on immigration, innovation, clean technology, trade and investment, and infrastructure.

===== Minister of Intergovernmental Affairs, Northern Affairs and Internal Trade =====
On July 18, 2018, LeBlanc was shuffled from Minister of Fisheries, Oceans and the Canadian Coast Guard to Minister of Intergovernmental Affairs, Northern Affairs and Internal Trade He also became vice-chair of the Cabinet Committee on Agenda, Results and Communications, which is manages the government’s overall strategic agenda and priority setting, and tracks implementation, which is chaired by the Prime Minister.

As Minister of Northern Affairs, LeBlanc shepherded legislation amending the Mackenzie Valley Resource Management Act to give Indigenous communities in the Northwest Territories and the surrounding region a greater say in the management of resource development projects.

On the internal trade front, LeBlanc advanced several initiatives to make it easier to trade within Canada. He pushed provinces and territories to standardize provincial regulations in several key industries, including construction, food and drink, and manufacturing, reducing administrative burdens and making it easier for businesses to do business in other provinces. In December 2018, at a First Ministers’ Meeting in Montréal, LeBlanc led a discussion with Premiers on ways to strengthen internal trade in Canada.

On April 26, 2019, LeBlanc announced he would be stepping back from cabinet as he sought treatment for cancer.

==== 43rd Canadian Parliament ====
===== President of the Queen’s Privy Council for Canada =====
On November 20, 2019, LeBlanc returned to Cabinet as President of the Queen's Privy Council for Canada, a position with reduced responsibilities. His former role as Minister of Intergovernmental Affairs, Northern Affairs and Internal Trade, was split between the minister of northern affairs, and the minister of intergovernmental affairs.

After the resignation of Bill Morneau as Minister of Finance, LeBlanc again became Minister of Intergovernmental Affairs after his successor, Chrystia Freeland, took the role of Minister of Finance in a cabinet shuffle on August 18, 2020. He retained his position as President of the Queen's Privy Council for Canada.

==== 44th Canadian Parliament ====
===== Minister of Intergovernmental Affairs, Infrastructure and Communities =====
On October 26, 2021, LeBlanc was appointed Minister of Intergovernmental Affairs, Infrastructure and Communities, as well as chair of the Sub-Committee on Intergovernmental Coordination, which takes an intergovernmental lens to the key issues before the government. He continued to chair the Cabinet Committee on Operations and the Sub-Committee on the Federal Response to the Coronavirus Disease (COVID-19).

During his tenure, he oversaw the allocation of billions of dollars of investment through the Investing in Canada Infrastructure Program (ICIP) and reached deals with provinces and territories to accelerate the allocation of their respective ICIP funding envelopes ahead of the planned deadline. This was meant to boost public investment in job-creating projects during a time of economic uncertainty caused by the COVID-19 pandemic.

In addition, LeBlanc launched calls for applications under several funds, including the Green and Inclusive Community Buildings Program and the Disaster Mitigation and Adaption Fund. Both funds brought hundreds of millions of dollars in investment to communities across the country and helped them reduce their carbon footprint while becoming more resilient to the effects of climate change.

Throughout this time, LeBlanc also retained responsibilities for two previously-held files, Democratic Institutions and Internal Trade.

In his role as Minister responsible for Democratic Institutions, he oversaw the adoption of the Preserving Provincial Representation in the House of Commons Act in 2022, which amended the Constitution Act, 1867 to provide that a province may not have fewer Members of Parliament than it had during the 43rd Parliament. This was in response to riding boundary adjustments made following the 2021 decennial census, which would otherwise have seen Quebec lose a seat in the House of Commons.

In his role as Minister responsible for Internal Trade, in December 2022, he launched the Federal Action Plan to Strengthen Internal Trade, which led to the removal and narrowing of one third of all federal exceptions in the 2017 Canadian Free Trade Agreement.

In his role as Minister of Intergovernmental Affairs, LeBlanc worked with provincial and territorial Premiers to follow up on the February 2023 First Ministers’ Working Meeting on healthcare. All provinces and territories would eventually reach bilateral agreements on healthcare funding, which will see 198 billion dollars invested in healthcare over the ten-year life of the agreements.

Following the conclusion of a supply and confidence agreement between the Liberals and the New Democratic Party (NDP), Delivering for Canadians Now, the Prime Minister appointed LeBlanc to the oversight group struck to ensure that the commitments outlined in the agreement remained on track. LeBlanc would remain a member of the steering committee until the NDP put an end to the agreement in September 2024.

LeBlanc was also designated by the Prime Minister to be the lead minister on the Government of Canada’s response to the Public Order Emergency Commission (otherwise known as the Rouleau Commission), which was created following the invocation of the Emergencies Act by the Government of Canada to put an end to several illegal blockades in Ottawa and across the country in February 2022. He released the Government of Canada’s response to the Commission’s Final Report on March 6, 2024.

===== Minister of Public Safety, Democratic Institutions and Intergovernmental Affairs =====
On July 26, 2023, LeBlanc was appointed Minister of Public Safety, Democratic Institutions and Intergovernmental Affairs. His appointment came as the issue of foreign interference in Canadian democratic processes was being pursued in media reporting and Parliamentary proceedings. LeBlanc led the government's response to calls for a public inquiry on the issue, and negotiated with the other recognized parties regarding the terms of reference and scope of the inquiry. On September 7, 2023, LeBlanc announced the appointment of Québec Court of Appeal Justice Marie-Josée Hogue to lead the Public Inquiry into Foreign Interference in Federal Electoral Processes and Democratic Institutions.

In February 2024, LeBlanc hosted Canada’s first-ever National Summit on Combatting Auto Theft. Bringing together elected officials, law enforcement agencies, and the auto industry, the Summit was successful in mobilizing partners around this issue. The Government of Canada subsequently released a National Action Plan on Combatting Auto Theft, which led to a 17% reduction in the number of vehicles being reported stolen as well as a 19% reduction in the number of stolen vehicles claims in the first half of 2024 in Canada.

In March 2024, LeBlanc released the Government of Canada’s response to the Mass Casualty Commission’s Final Report, Turning the Tide Together. The Commission was struck following the deadliest mass shooting in Canadian history in April 2020 in Portapique, Nova Scotia, which claimed the lives of 22 people.

That same month, LeBlanc also introduced the Electoral Participation Act, which contained many of the commitments in the supply and confidence agreement between the Liberals and the NDP, including allowing Canadians to vote at any polling place within their riding and making it easier to vote by mail.

As Public Safety Minister, LeBlanc also oversaw the adoption of several pieces of legislation. He shepherded C-21, An Act to amend certain Acts and to make certain consequential amendments (firearms), which his predecessor had introduced, through committee consideration and third reading in the Senate. The Act significantly strengthened Canada’s gun control laws. It codified a handgun freeze the Liberals had previously enacted through regulation; enacted tougher sentences for weapons smuggling and trafficking; instituted new license requirements to transfer, purchase or import firearms parts such as cartridges, barrels, and handgun slides; created new offences regarding the possession or distribution of 3D printer data for the purpose of manufacturing or trafficking a firearm; and enacted new “red flags” laws to enable individuals to apply for a court order to remove firearms from an individual posing a public safety risk, particularly in intimate partner violence contexts.

LeBlanc also oversaw the adoption in 2024 of Bill C-20, the Public Complaints and Review Commission Act, a bill the Liberals had previously introduced twice (in both the 42nd and 43rd Parliament) and which had previously died on the order paper when Parliament was dissolved. It established a civilian complaints review process for the Canada Border Services Agency (CBSA), strengthening the oversight of the CBSA’s activities and bringing it up to par with oversight mechanisms that apply to several Canadian policing agencies, including the RCMP.

In addition, LeBlanc introduced the Countering Foreign Interference Act, which significantly modernized the Canadian Security Intelligence Service Act for the first time in its 40-year existence; enacted the Foreign Influence Transparency and Accountability Act, which created a new foreign influence transparency registry; and instituted new foreign interference-related criminal offences in the Criminal Code and the Foreign Interference and Security of Information Act. He was able to secure agreement from all recognized parties to speed up passage of the legislation, which was introduced on May 6, 2024 and received Royal Assent on June 20, 2024.

LeBlanc’s tenure was also marked by a rise in antisemitism and islamophobia in light of the October 7, 2023 attacks in Israel by Hamas. In response, LeBlanc implemented immediate enhancements to the Security Infrastructure Program to quickly provide community groups at risk of hate-motivated crime with funding to secure their places of worship and community gathering spaces. Following consultations with affected communities, in September 2024, LeBlanc launched the Canada Community Security Program, which replaced the Security Infrastructure Program and made several of the temporary enhancements permanent.

During LeBlanc’s tenure at Public Safety, the Government of Canada listed three groups as terrorist entities under the Criminal Code – the Islamic Revolutionary Guard Corps, Samidoun, and Ansarallah.

In November 2024, LeBlanc accompanied Prime Minister Trudeau for his meeting with U.S. President-elect Donald Trump at Mar-a-Lago.

===== Minister of Finance and Intergovernmental Affairs =====
On December 16, 2024, he was sworn in as the minister of finance following the surprise resignation of former finance minister and deputy prime minister Chrystia Freeland. LeBlanc was considered as a possible candidate in the 2025 Liberal Party of Canada leadership election, upon the resignation of Trudeau. He declined to run in the election, citing the need to focus on potential tariffs from the incoming second Trump administration.

==== 45th Canadian Parliament ====
On May 13, 2025, following the 2025 federal election, which was won by the incumbent Liberal Party, LeBlanc was appointed President of the King’s Privy Council for Canada and Minister responsible for Canada-U.S. Trade, Intergovernmental Affairs and One Canadian Economy.

===== Canada-U.S. Trade =====
In addition to retaining responsibility for intergovernmental affairs, LeBlanc was tasked with establishing a new economic and security relationship with the United States. Since Prime Minister Trudeau’s visit to Mar-a-Lago in November 2024, LeBlanc had become a key interlocutor with the United States Commerce Secretary, Howard Lutnick, and accompanied Prime Minister Carney on his visit to Washington on May 6, 2025. .

The Hill Times named him to its list of the 50 most influential people in Canadian foreign policy in both 2025 and 2026. In their 2025 listing, a former senior government official credited him as central to "every ounce of progress" Canada made with the United States, and he is called a "savvy operator" able to put people at ease while still delivering tough news. In 2026, he is described as being at the centre of every Canada-U.S. discussion, including matters beyond trade such as security, and is described as "the guy who can make a good relationship out of a tough start."

Along with Marc-André Blanchard and Janice Charette, LeBlanc was part of the Canadian negotiating team in the August 2026 collapsed trade talks between the US and Canada.

===== One Canadian Economy =====
Carney also tasked LeBlanc with building "One Canadian Economy" by removing barriers to interprovincial trade, and identifying and expediting nation-building projects. During the post-election sitting of Parliament, LeBlanc was the lead minister on Bill C-5, the One Canadian Economy Act, which received Royal assent on June 26. Part two of the Act enacts the Building Canada Act, which institutes a process by which the federal Cabinet can designate certain projects as being in the national interest. Designation provides upfront approval for the project and expedites regulatory reviews so that the project benefits from a final regulatory decision within two years. The Act fulfilled a key pledge from the Liberal campaign, which centered around the need for Canada to become less reliant on the United States. The Liberals committed to building trade-enabling and energy infrastructure that would allow Canada to diversify its trade relationships away from the United States and bolster its internal market.

On September 16, 2025, LeBlanc added the role of Minister of Internal Trade to his portfolio following the resignation of Chrystia Freeland from cabinet.

== Recognition ==
LeBlanc was awarded an Honorary Doctor of Laws by Mount Allison University, located in his riding, in 2021, and by the Université de Moncton in 2026.

In November 2025, LeBlanc was voted Parliamentarian of the Year by his fellow MPs in a survey conducted by iPolitics.

== Electoral record ==
2025 Canadian federal election: Beauséjour
| Party | Candidate | Votes | % | ±% | Expenditures |
|---|---|---|---|---|---|
| Liberal | Dominic LeBlanc | 36,139 | 60.60 | +5.07 | $78,951.57 |
| Conservative | Nathalie Vautour | 19,862 | 33.31 | +13.89 | $28,755.05 |
| New Democratic | Alex Gagne | 1,448 | 2.43 | −8.55 | $0.00 |
| Green | Josh Shaddick | 1,291 | 2.16 | −3.53 | $0.00 |
| People's | Eddie Cornell | 503 | 0.84 | −6.74 | $25.51 |
| Libertarian | Donna Allen | 388 | 0.65 | N/A | $0.00 |
| Total valid votes/expense limit | | 59,631 | 99.42 | +0.01 | $126,723.22 |
| Total rejected ballots | | 350 | 0.58 | –0.01 | |
| Turnout | | 59,981 | 77.36 | +9.83 | |
| Eligible voters | | 77,532 | | | |
| Liberal notional hold | | Swing | | −4.41 | |
Source: Elections Canada
Note: number of eligible voters does not include voting day registrations.

2021 Canadian federal election: Beauséjour
| Party | Candidate | Votes | % | ±% | Expenditures |
|---|---|---|---|---|---|
| Liberal | Dominic LeBlanc | 27,313 | 55.6 | +9.1 | $66,501.84 |
| Conservative | Shelly Mitchell | 9,526 | 19.4 | +1.8 | $14,489.19 |
| New Democratic | Evelyne Godfrey | 5,394 | 11.0 | +3.7 | $516.68 |
| People's | Jack Minor | 3,723 | 7.6 | +5.6 | $11,448.76 |
| Green | Stella Anna Girouard | 2,798 | 5.7 | −21.0 | $864.18 |
| Free | Isabelle Sauriol Chiasson | 391 | 0.8 | N/A | $0.00 |
| Total valid votes/expense limit | | 49,145 | 99.4 | – | $107,726.91 |
| Total rejected ballots | | 294 | 0.6 | | |
| Turnout | | 49,439 | 68.0 | −10.0 | |
| Registered voters | | 72,726 | | | |
| Liberal hold | | Swing | | +5.5 | |
Source: Elections Canada

2019 Canadian federal election: Beauséjour
| Party | Candidate | Votes | % | ±% | Expenditures |
|---|---|---|---|---|---|
| Liberal | Dominic LeBlanc | 24,948 | 46.47 | −22.54 | $83,393.36 |
| Green | Laura Reinsborough | 14,305 | 26.65 | +22.16 | $74,321.26 |
| Conservative | Vincent Cormier | 9,438 | 17.58 | +6.21 | $39,043.98 |
| New Democratic | Jean-Marc Bélanger | 3,940 | 7.34 | −7.79 | none listed |
| People's | Nancy Mercier | 1,054 | 1.96 | New | $6,338.64 |
| Total valid votes/expense limit | | 53,685 | 100.0 | | $101,392.80 |
| Total rejected ballots | | 475 | 0.88 | +0.28 | |
| Turnout | | 54,160 | 77.99 | −2.49 | |
| Eligible voters | | 69,444 | | | |
| Liberal hold | | Swing | | −22.35 | |
Source: Elections Canada

2015 Canadian federal election
| Party | Candidate | Votes | % | ±% | Expenditures |
|---|---|---|---|---|---|
| Liberal | Dominic LeBlanc | 36,534 | 69.02 | +28.33 | $77,614.48 |
| New Democratic | Hélène Boudreau | 8,009 | 15.13 | –8.30 | $24,161.02 |
| Conservative | Ann Bastarache | 6,017 | 11.37 | –20.35 | – |
| Green | Kevin King | 2,376 | 4.49 | +0.32 | $1,009.07 |
| Total valid votes/Expense limit | | 52,936 | 100.00 | | $200,494.19 |
| Total rejected ballots | | 320 | 0.60 | | |
| Turnout | | 53,256 | 80.48 | | |
| Eligible voters | | 66,170 | | | |
| Liberal notional hold | | Swing | | +18.31 | |
Source: Elections Canada

2011 Canadian federal election
| Party | Candidate | Votes | % | ±% | Expenditures |
|---|---|---|---|---|---|
| Liberal | Dominic LeBlanc | 17,399 | 39.08 | −7.68 | |
| Conservative | Evelyn Chapman | 14,814 | 33.27 | +4.12 | |
| New Democratic | Susan Levi-Peters | 10,397 | 23.35 | +6.47 | |
| Green | Natalie Arsenault | 1,913 | 4.3 | −2.89 | |
| Total valid votes/Expense limit | | – | 100.00 | | |
| Liberal hold | | Swing | | +5.90 | |

2008 Canadian federal election
| Party | Candidate | Votes | % | ±% |
|---|---|---|---|---|
| Liberal | Dominic LeBlanc | 19,972 | 46.6 | -0.95 |
| Conservative | Omer Léger | 12,512 | 29.2 | −3.03 |
| New Democratic | Chris Durrant | 7,219 | 16.8 | +0.13 |
| Green | Mike Milligan | 3,187 | 7.4 | +4.61 |
| Total valid votes | | 42,890 | | |
| Liberal hold | | Swing | | −2.08 |

2006 Canadian federal election
| Party | Candidate | Votes | % | ±% |
|---|---|---|---|---|
| Liberal | Dominic LeBlanc | 22,012 | 47.55 | −5.73 |
| Conservative | Omer Léger | 14,919 | 32.23 | +4.04 |
| New Democratic | Neil Gardner | 7,717 | 16.67 | +1.96 |
| Green | Anna Girouard | 1,290 | 2.79 | −1.03 |
| Independent | Frank Comeau | 357 | 0.77 | Ø |
| Total valid votes | | 46,295 | | |
| Liberal hold | | Swing | | +4.89 |

2004 Canadian federal election
| Party | Candidate | Votes | % | ±% |
|---|---|---|---|---|
| Liberal | Dominic LeBlanc | 21,934 | 53.28 | +6.18 |
| Conservative | Angela Vautour | 11,604 | 28.19 | −17.65 |
| New Democratic | Omer Bourque | 6,056 | 14.71 | +7.65 |
| Green | Anna Girouard | 1,574 | 3.82 | Ø |
| Total valid votes | | 41,168 | | |
| Liberal hold | | Swing | | +11.92 |

2000 Canadian federal election
| Party | Candidate | Votes | % | ±% |
|---|---|---|---|---|
| Liberal | Dominic LeBlanc | 21,465 | 47.10 | +12.27 |
| Progressive Conservative | Angela Vautour | 14,631 | 32.11 | +16.11 |
| Alliance | Tom Taylor | 6256 | 13.73 | +3.55 |
| New Democratic | Inka Milewski | 3217 | 7.06 | −31.93 |
| Total valid votes | | 45,569 | | |
| Liberal gain from New Democratic | | Swing | | +22.10 |

1997 Canadian federal election
| Party | Candidate | Votes | % | ±% |
|---|---|---|---|---|
| New Democratic | Angela Vautour | 18,504 | 38.99 | +33.25 |
| Liberal | Dominic LeBlanc | 16,529 | 34.83 | −41.20 |
| Progressive Conservative | Ian Hamilton | 7592 | 16.00 | +0.78 |
| Reform | Raymond Braun | 4833 | 10.18 | Ø |
| Total valid votes | | 47,458 | | |
| New Democratic gain from Liberal | | Swing | | +37.23 |

== Personal life ==
In 2003, he married Jolène Richard, a former Moncton lawyer who became a judge on the Provincial Court of New Brunswick in 2008, and eventually became a chief judge. She is the daughter of Guy A. Richard, who served as Chief Justice of the Court of Queen's Bench of New Brunswick. He has an adult stepson.

At the time of the 2025 Canadian federal election, he lived in Grande-Digue, New Brunswick.

=== Cancer treatment ===
In December 2017, he announced that he had been diagnosed with chronic lymphocytic leukemia and would begin chemotherapy immediately while continuing to serve in his parliamentary roles. However, following a period of remission, his cancer took a turn for the worse. On April 26, 2019, LeBlanc announced he would be stepping back from cabinet as he sought treatment.

In September 2019, LeBlanc underwent a stem cell transplant at Maisonneuve-Rosemont Hospital in Montréal, Québec to cure his non-Hodgkin’s lymphoma, an extremely rare form of cancer. Following initial chemotherapy treatments at the CHU Dr. Georges L. Dumont Hospital in Moncton, New Brunswick, his doctors referred him to specialists at Maisonneuve-Rosemont Hospital due to the severity and aggressiveness of his cancer. He spent 56 nights, spanning most of the 2019 federal election campaign, in an isolation room at Maisonneuve-Rosemont.

He was sworn in as President of the Queen’s Privy Council in November 2019, two weeks after being discharged from the hospital, and returned to the House of Commons in late January 2020.

LeBlanc has talked publicly about his experience with cancer and his stem cell transplant. After the regular two-years non-contact time between donor and patient, in September 2022, he met with his stem cell donor, German national Jonathan Kehl. The meeting between the two was the subject of significant attention in Canadian media. LeBlanc also travelled to Germany to visit Kehl’s family in May 2023.

=== Arms ===
Coat of arms of Dominic LeBlanc

Notes
inherited his arms from his father
Adopted
January 1, 1995 (granted to his father), June 24, 2009 (inherited)
Crest
Four eagle feathers within a circlet of Micmac quill decoration Gules
Torse
Argent and Gules
Escutcheon
Argent on a pile Gules the Star of Acadia ensigned by a representation of the Royal Crown Or;
Supporters
Two dolphins Argent each gorged with a collar of maple leaves Gules and fleurs de lys Or, pendant there from a plate Azure, dexter surmounted by a steam locomotive wheel Or, sinister surmounted by a book Or
Compartment
Issuant from a mound set with maple leaves all Gules flanked by waves proper
Motto
SEMPER AMISSOS MEMINISSE DECET
(It is right to remember the forgotten)
Symbolism
The use of white recalls the LeBlanc family name, while the pile refers to the Memramcook Valley, where Roméo LeBlanc was born, and the dolphins evoke the Rivière Dauphin (now Annapolis River), where LeBlanc's ancestors settled in the mid 17th century, as well as Roméo LeBlanc's maritime heritage and his service as the minister of fisheries. The star is a symbol long used by the Acadians, as are the fleurs de lys representative of LeBlanc's roots in that community, and the royal crown represents Roméo LeBlanc's appointment as the representative of the Canadian sovereign. The eagle feathers, symbols of peace, honour the Canadian First Nations, and the number represents Roméo LeBlanc's four children. More family links are depicted in the steam locomotive wheel – representing LeBlanc's father's service on the Canadian railways – and the book evoking Roméo LeBlanc's training and work as a teacher. The compartment symbolises a multi-ethnic Canada between two seas, and recalls the Micmac origin of the word Memramcook, meaning multi-coloured landscape.

== Notes ==
30th Canadian Ministry (2025–present) – Cabinet of Mark Carney
Cabinet posts (3)
| Predecessor | Office | Successor |
|---|---|---|
| Chrystia Freeland | Minister of Internal Trade; 2025–present | Incumbent |
| Harjit Sajjan | President of the King's Privy Council for Canada; 2025–present | Incumbent |
| Position established | Minister responsible for Canada-U.S. Trade, Intergovernmental Affairs and One Canadian Economy; 2025–present | Incumbent |

29th Canadian Ministry (2015–2025) – Cabinet of Justin Trudeau
Cabinet posts (8)
| Predecessor | Office | Successor |
|---|---|---|
| Chrystia Freeland; Himself | Minister of Finance and Intergovernmental Affairs; 2024–2025 | François-Philippe Champagne; Himself |
| Marco Mendicino; Himself | Minister of Public Safety, Democratic Institutions and Intergovernmental Affairs; 2023–2024 | David McGuinty; Ruby Sahota |
| Himself; Catherine McKenna | Minister of Intergovernmental Affairs, Infrastructure and Communities; 2021–2023 | Himself; Sean Fraser |
| Chrystia Freeland | Minister of Intergovernmental Affairs; 2020–2021 | Himself |
| Karina Gould | President of the Queen's Privy Council for Canada; 2019–2021 | Bill Blair |
| Justin Trudeau; Carolyn Bennett | Minister of Intergovernmental and Northern Affairs and Internal Trade; 2018–2019 | Chrystia Freeland; Dan Vandal |
| Hunter Tootoo | Minister of Fisheries, Oceans and the Canadian Coast Guard; 2016–2018 | Jonathan Wilkinson |
| Peter Van Loan | Leader of the Government in the House of Commons; 2015–2016 | Bardish Chagger |
Order of precedence
| Preceded by Chargé d'affaires as Representatives to Canada of foreign governments | Order of Precedence of Canada as Member of the Cabinet | Succeeded by Mélanie Joly as Member of the Cabinet |
