= Intergovernmental Affairs Secretariat (Canada) =

The Intergovernmental Affairs Secretariat (French: Secrétariat des affaires intergouvernementales) is a government agency of Canada that is part of the Privy Council Office. Directed by a deputy minister, it supports the Minister of Intergovernmental Affairs and, through the Clerk of the Privy Council and Secretary to the Cabinet, the Prime Minister of Canada and Cabinet, with respect to policy and communications in such areas as federal-provincial-territorial relations, Aboriginal affairs, the evolution of the federation and Canadian unity.

Intergovernmental Affairs provides analysis, advice, liaison and strategic planning. It monitors policy files with important intergovernmental dimensions, assesses federal, provincial and territorial priorities, and works with federal departments and the provincial and territorial governments. It also addresses constitutional and legal issues relating to the evolution of the federation and Canadian unity.

The mandate of Intergovernmental Affairs also consists in co-ordinating the efforts of the Government of Canada to make the federation more efficient and to enable governments to address citizens' needs ever more effectively.
