= Government House Leader =

Canadian cabinet minister

Leader of the Government in the House of Commons
- Leader du gouvernement à la Chambre des communes
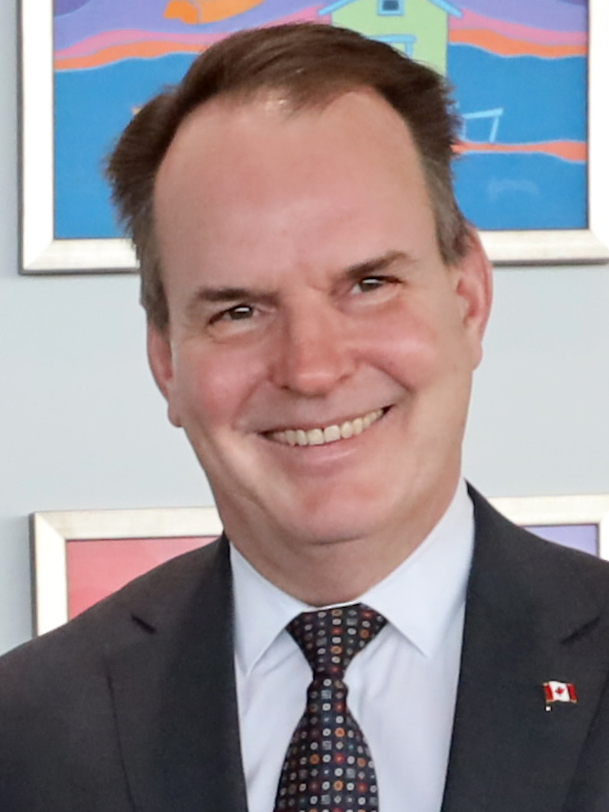
- Incumbent; Steven MacKinnon since May 13, 2025
- Privy Council Office
- Style: The Honourable
- Member of: House of Commons; Privy Council; Cabinet
- Reports to: Prime Minister
- Appointer: Monarch (represented by the governor general); on the advice of the prime minister
- Term length: At His Majesty's pleasure
- Inaugural holder: Ian Alistair Mackenzie
- Formation: October 14, 1944
- Deputy: Deputy Leader of the Government in the House of Commons
- Salary: $299,900 (2024)
- Website: www.canada.ca/en/leader-government-house-commons.html

The leader of the Government in the House of Commons (French: leader du gouvernement à la Chambre des communes), often simplified to Government House Leader, is the member of Parliament (MP) from the government caucus who is responsible for planning and managing the government's legislative program in the House of Commons. The position is often held concurrently with another portfolio by a Cabinet minister. Despite the name of the position, it does not refer to the prime minister, who is the head of government.

== History ==
From 1867 until World War II, prime ministers took upon themselves the responsibilities of being leader of the government in the House of Commons, organizing and coordinating House of Commons business with the other parties. The expansion of government responsibilities during the war led to Prime Minister William Lyon Mackenzie King deciding to delegate the House leadership to one of his ministers. In 1946, the position of government house leader was formally recognized.

In 1968, Prime Minister Pierre Trudeau designated the government house leader as president of the Queen's Privy Council for Canada. Under Prime Minister Brian Mulroney, the roles of government house leader and president of the Privy Council were separated in 1989. Under Mulroney and his successors, the position of house leader would often be held by someone who was named a minister of state without any portfolio responsibilities specified. Since 2003, this minister of state status has been obscured in all but the most official circumstances by the use of a "Leader of the Government in the House of Commons" style in its place.

Prime Minister Paul Martin's first House Leader, Jacques Saada was also the minister responsible for democratic reform; however, with the election of a minority government in the 2004 election, Martin appointed Tony Valeri to the position of leader of the government in the House of Commons with no additional responsibilities.

== List of officeholders ==
Until 2005, the position of government house leader was not technically a cabinet-level post, but rather a parliamentary office, so to qualify for cabinet membership, an individual had to be named to cabinet in some other capacity. For a time, with the position having evolved into a full-time job, government house leaders have been named to cabinet as ministers of state with no portfolio specified. The Martin government created these positions so that the minister of state title is effectively invisible. An amendment to the Salaries Act made this unnecessary by listing the government house leader as a minister.

Key:

Liberal Party of Canada
Progressive Conservative Party of Canada
Conservative Party of Canada

Portrait	Name Electoral district (Birth–Death)	Term of office		Party	Prime minister (Ministry)
Portrait	Name Electoral district (Birth–Death)	Term start	Term end	Party	Prime minister (Ministry)
	Ian Alistair Mackenzie; MP for Vancouver Centre (1890–1949)	October 14, 1944	April 30, 1948	Liberal	William Lyon Mackenzie King (16th)
	Alphonse Fournier; MP for Hull (1893–1961)	May 1, 1948	May 8, 1953	Liberal	William Lyon Mackenzie King (16th)
	Alphonse Fournier; MP for Hull (1893–1961)	May 1, 1948	May 8, 1953	Liberal	Louis St. Laurent (17th)
	Walter Edward Harris; MP for Grey—Bruce (1904–1999)	May 9, 1953	April 12, 1957	Liberal	Louis St. Laurent (17th)
	Howard Charles Green; MP for Vancouver Quadra (1895–1989)	October 14, 1957	July 18, 1959	Progressive Conservative	John Diefenbaker (18th)
	Gordon Churchill; MP for Winnipeg South Centre (1898–1985)	January 14, 1960	February 5, 1963	Progressive Conservative	John Diefenbaker (18th)
	Jack Pickersgill; MP for Bonavista—Twillingate (1905–1997)	May 16, 1963	December 21, 1963	Liberal	Lester B. Pearson (19th)
	Guy Favreau; MP for Papineau (1917–1967)	February 18, 1964	October 29, 1964	Liberal	Lester B. Pearson (19th)
	George McIlraith; MP for Ottawa West (1908–1992)	October 30, 1964	May 3, 1967	Liberal	Lester B. Pearson (19th)
	Allan MacEachen; MP for Inverness—Richmond (1921–2017)	May 4, 1967	April 23, 1968	Liberal	Lester B. Pearson (19th)
	Donald Stovel Macdonald; MP for Rosedale (1932–2018)	September 12, 1968	September 23, 1970	Liberal	Pierre Trudeau (20th)
	Allan MacEachen; MP for Cape Breton Highlands—Canso (1921–2017)	September 24, 1970	May 9, 1974	Liberal	Pierre Trudeau (20th)
	Mitchell Sharp; MP for Eglinton (1911–2004)	August 8, 1974	September 13, 1976	Liberal	Pierre Trudeau (20th)
	Allan MacEachen; MP for Cape Breton Highlands—Canso (1921–2017)	September 14, 1976	March 26, 1979	Liberal	Pierre Trudeau (20th)
	Walter Baker; MP for Nepean—Carleton (1930–1983)	June 4, 1979	March 2, 1980	Progressive Conservative	Joe Clark (21st)
	Yvon Pinard; MP for Drummond (born 1940)	March 3, 1980	June 29, 1984	Liberal	Pierre Trudeau (22nd)
	André Ouellet; MP for Papineau (born 1939)	June 30, 1984	November 4, 1984	Liberal	John Turner (23rd)
	Ray Hnatyshyn; MP for Saskatoon West (1934–2002)	November 5, 1984	June 29, 1986	Progressive Conservative	Brian Mulroney (24th)
	Don Mazankowski; MP for Vegreville (1935–2020)	June 30, 1986	April 2, 1989	Progressive Conservative	Brian Mulroney (24th)
	Doug Lewis; MP for Simcoe North (born 1938)	April 3, 1989	February 22, 1990	Progressive Conservative	Brian Mulroney (24th)
	Harvie Andre; MP for Calgary Centre (1940–2012)	February 23, 1990	June 24, 1993	Progressive Conservative	Brian Mulroney (24th)
	Doug Lewis; MP for Simcoe North (born 1938)	June 25, 1993	November 3, 1993	Progressive Conservative	Kim Campbell (25th)
	Herb Gray; MP for Windsor West (1931–2014)	November 4, 1993	April 27, 1997	Liberal	Jean Chrétien (26th)
	Don Boudria; MP for Glengarry–Prescott–Russell (born 1949)	June 11, 1997	January 14, 2002	Liberal	Jean Chrétien (26th)
	Ralph Goodale; MP for Wascana (born 1949)	January 15, 2002	May 25, 2002	Liberal	Jean Chrétien (26th)
	Don Boudria; MP for Glengarry–Prescott–Russell (born 1949)	May 26, 2002	December 11, 2003	Liberal	Jean Chrétien (26th)
	Jacques Saada; MP for Brossard—La Prairie (born 1947)	December 12, 2003	July 20, 2004	Liberal	Paul Martin (27th)
	Tony Valeri; MP for Hamilton East—Stoney Creek (born 1957)	July 20, 2004	January 23, 2006	Liberal	Paul Martin (27th)
	Rob Nicholson; MP for Niagara Falls (born 1952)	February 6, 2006	January 4, 2007	Conservative	Stephen Harper (28th)
	Peter Van Loan; MP for York—Simcoe (born 1963)	January 4, 2007	October 29, 2008	Conservative	Stephen Harper (28th)
	Jay Hill; MP for Prince George—Peace River (born 1952)	October 30, 2008	August 6, 2010	Conservative	Stephen Harper (28th)
	John Baird; MP for Ottawa West—Nepean (born 1969)	August 6, 2010	May 18, 2011	Conservative	Stephen Harper (28th)
	Peter Van Loan; MP for York—Simcoe (born 1963)	May 18, 2011	November 4, 2015	Conservative	Stephen Harper (28th)
	Dominic LeBlanc; MP for Beauséjour (born 1967)	November 4, 2015	August 19, 2016	Liberal	Justin Trudeau (29th)
	Bardish Chagger; MP for Waterloo (born 1980)	August 19, 2016	November 20, 2019	Liberal	Justin Trudeau (29th)
	Pablo Rodriguez; MP for Honoré-Mercier (born 1967)	November 20, 2019	October 26, 2021	Liberal	Justin Trudeau (29th)
	Mark Holland; MP for Ajax (born 1974)	October 26, 2021	July 26, 2023	Liberal	Justin Trudeau (29th)
	Karina Gould; MP for Burlington (born 1987) (on parental leave January 8—late July 2024)	July 26, 2023	January 8, 2024	Liberal	Justin Trudeau (29th)
	Steven MacKinnon (interim); MP for Gatineau (born 1966)	January 8, 2024	July 19, 2024	Liberal	Justin Trudeau (29th)
	Karina Gould; MP for Burlington (born 1987) (on parental leave January 8—late July 2024)	July 19, 2024	January 24, 2025	Liberal	Justin Trudeau (29th)
	Steven MacKinnon; MP for Gatineau (born 1966)	January 24, 2025	March 14, 2025	Liberal	Justin Trudeau (29th)
	Arielle Kayabaga; MP for London West (born 1990 or 1991)	March 14, 2025	May 13, 2025	Liberal	Mark Carney (30th)
	Steven MacKinnon; MP for Gatineau (born 1966)	May 13, 2025	Present	Liberal	Mark Carney (30th)
