= Guy A. Richard =

Canadian judge

Chief Justice of the Queen's Bench of New Brunswick
- In office 1982–1994
- Nominated by: Pierre Trudeau
- Preceded by: Adrien J. Cormier
- Succeeded by: Joseph Daigle

Personal details
- Born: June 1932 (age 93) Sainte-Anne-de-Kent, New Brunswick, Canada
- Occupation: Lawyer

Guy A. Richard, ONB QC (born June 1932) is a former lawyer and former Chief Justice of the Queen's Bench of New Brunswick from 1982 to 1994.

== Personal life ==
Richard was born in Sainte-Anne-de-Kent, the son of André F. Richard, who served as a MLA.

== Career ==
He was a lawyer in Bouctouche from 1958 to 1971.

In 1971, he was appointed a Judge of the Provincial Court of New Brunswick, serving in the Northwestern area. In 1976, he was appointed a Judge of the Court of Queen's Bench. In 1979, he was appointed a Justice of the New Brunswick Court of Appeal.

In 1982, Mr. Richard was named Chief Justice of the Court of Queen's Bench of New Brunswick and served the people of his province in that role until his retirement in 1994.

Post-retirement, he continued to serve as an adjudicator, notably as mediator in the strike between Canada Post Corporation and the Canadian Union of Postal Workers in 1998.

In 2001, he led a committee on the future of the Université de Moncton, helping the university set its future course as a comprehensive, francophone institution of higher learning and research. In 2003, he served with fellow Order of New Brunswick inductee Roger Augustine as mediator during the dispute between non-Aboriginal and Aboriginal fishers at Burnt Church. In 2004, Mr. Richard was appointed Chair of the Federal Electoral Boundaries Commission of New Brunswick and officially retired from judicial duties in the summer of 2007.

== Recognition and awards ==
In 1987, the Université de Moncton offered him an honorary doctorate degree.

== Personal life ==
He is married to Germaine Theriault. They had 5 children, Andre G. Richard Q.C., Chief Justice Jolène Richard, Denis Richard, Martine Richard, and Dr. Carole Richard.
