= Privy Council Office (Canada) =

Agency of the Government of Canada

- Bureau du Conseil privé

Agency overview
- Formed: 1867
- Jurisdiction: Government of Canada
- Headquarters: Office of the Prime Minister and Privy Council building, 80 Wellington Street, Ottawa, Ontario, Canada
- Employees: 1,169
- Annual budget: CA$144.9 million (2017–18)
- Minister responsible: Mark Carney, Prime Minister; Steven MacKinnon, Leader of the Government in the House of Commons; Dominic LeBlanc, President of the Privy Council
- Deputy Minister responsible: Michael Sabia, Clerk of the Privy Council
- Website: pco-bcp.gc.ca

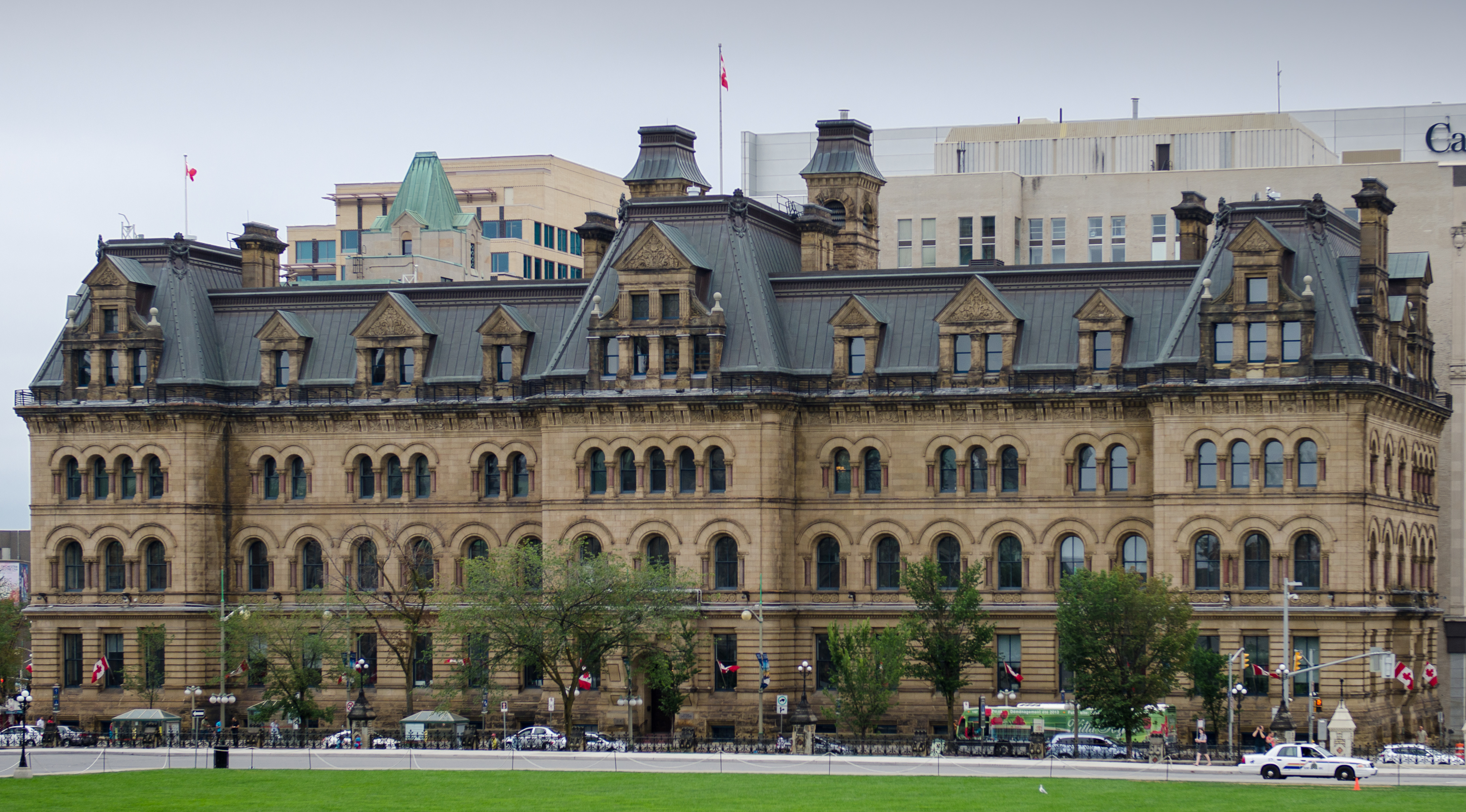
The Office's present location in the Office of the Prime Minister and Privy Council building at 80 Wellington Street in Ottawa

The Privy Council Office (PCO; French: Bureau du Conseil privé; BCP) is the central agency of the Government of Canada which acts as the secretariat to the Cabinet of Canada – a committee of the King's Privy Council for Canada – and provides non-partisan advice and support to the Canadian ministry, as well as leadership, coordination, and support to the departments and agencies of government.

The clerk of the Privy Council, who leads the department, is the head of the civil service of Canada, and acts as the deputy minister to the prime minister, who is the minister responsible for the department. The Privy Council Office is in the Office of the Prime Minister and Privy Council building (previously known as Langevin Block) on Parliament Hill.

== Overview ==
Although the Privy Council Office has grown in size and complexity over the years, its main pillars remain the operations and plans secretariats. The former is primarily concerned with coordinating the day-to-day issues of government while the latter takes a medium-term view to the evolution of the Canadian federation. Each incoming prime minister will re-organize the Privy Council Office to suit the policy agenda of their government. Today, the Privy Council Office includes a department of intergovernmental affairs, secretariats for appointments, communications, public service renewal, foreign and defence policy, security and intelligence, social affairs, economic affairs, legislation and house planning and machinery of government.

Traditionally, the Privy Council Office has served as a "finishing school" for civil servants destined for executive positions within government. Officials who spend several years gaining experience at the Privy Council Office, and working on policy matters from the perspective of the prime minister, return to their home departments with a greater appreciation of government operations at the corporate level. Aside from senior positions within the civil service, Privy Council Office alumni have gone on to pursue successful careers in business and politics, including Paul Tellier, former chief executive officer of Bombardier; Michael Sabia, chief executive officer of Bell Canada; Robert Rabinovitch, chief executive officer of the Canadian Broadcasting Corporation; former Prime Minister Pierre Trudeau; and former Minister of Foreign Affairs Pierre Pettigrew.

The head of the civil service has the title of clerk of the Privy Council, and also serves as the secretary to the Cabinet and deputy minister to the prime minister.

The Privy Council Office's role is different from that of the Prime Minister's Office, which is a personal and partisan office. It is understood that the prime minister should not receive advice from only one institutionalized source. To that end, the Privy Council Office serves as the policy-oriented but politically neutral advisory unit to the prime minister, while the Prime Minister's Office is politically oriented but policy-sensitive.

The Privy Council Office is the parent department to government organizations such as the Major Projects Office and Canada's Fight Against Fentanyl. As of 2017, the Privy Council Office's Impact and Innovation Unit manages the Impact Canada behavioural sciences platform in partnership with other departments of the Government of Canada.

== Current structure of the Privy Council Office ==
- Clerk of the Privy Council and Secretary to the Cabinet
  - Deputy Secretary to the Cabinet, Operations
    - Assistant Secretary to the Cabinet, Social Development Policy
    - Assistant Secretary to the Cabinet, Economic and Regional Development Policy
    - Assistant Clerk of the Privy Council, Orders-in-Council
  - Deputy Secretary to the Cabinet, Plans and Consultations
    - Assistant Secretary to the Cabinet, Priorities and Planning and Results and Delivery Unit
    - Assistant Secretary to the Cabinet, Communications and Consultations
    - Assistant Secretary to the Cabinet, Liaison Secretariat for Macroeconomic Policy
  - Deputy Secretary to the Cabinet, Governance
    - Assistant Secretary to the Cabinet, Machinery of Government and Democratic Institutions
    - Assistant Secretary to the Cabinet, Legislation and House Planning
  - Deputy Secretary to the Cabinet, Senior Personnel and Public Service Renewal
    - Assistant Secretary to the Cabinet, Senior Personnel
    - Assistant Secretary to the Cabinet, Public Service Renewal
  - Assistant Secretary, Ministerial Services and Corporate Affairs
  - Counsel to the Clerk of the Privy Council and Assistant Deputy Minister
  - Deputy Minister of Intergovernmental Affairs
    - Assistant Deputy Minister, Multilateral Relations
    - Assistant Deputy Minister, Bilateral Relations
  - Deputy Secretary to the Cabinet, Economic Policy
  - Deputy Clerk of the Privy Council and Associate Secretary to the Cabinet
    - Assistant Secretary to the Cabinet, Impact and Innovation Unit
    - Chief Audit Executive
  - Deputy Clerk of the Privy Council and National Security and Intelligence Advisor to the Prime Minister
    - Deputy National Security and Intelligence Advisor to the Prime Minister
      - Assistant Secretary to the Cabinet, Security and Intelligence
      - Assistant Secretary to the Cabinet, National Security Council Secretariat
    - Foreign and Defence Policy Advisor to the Prime Minister
      - Assistant Secretary to the Cabinet, Foreign and Defence Policy (Policy)
    - Fentanyl Czar
      - Assistant Deputy Minister, Canada’s Fight Against Fentanyl

== See also ==
- King's Privy Council for Canada
