= Minister of Intergovernmental Affairs =

Ministerial position in the Federal Government of Canada

- Ministre des Affaires intergouvernementales
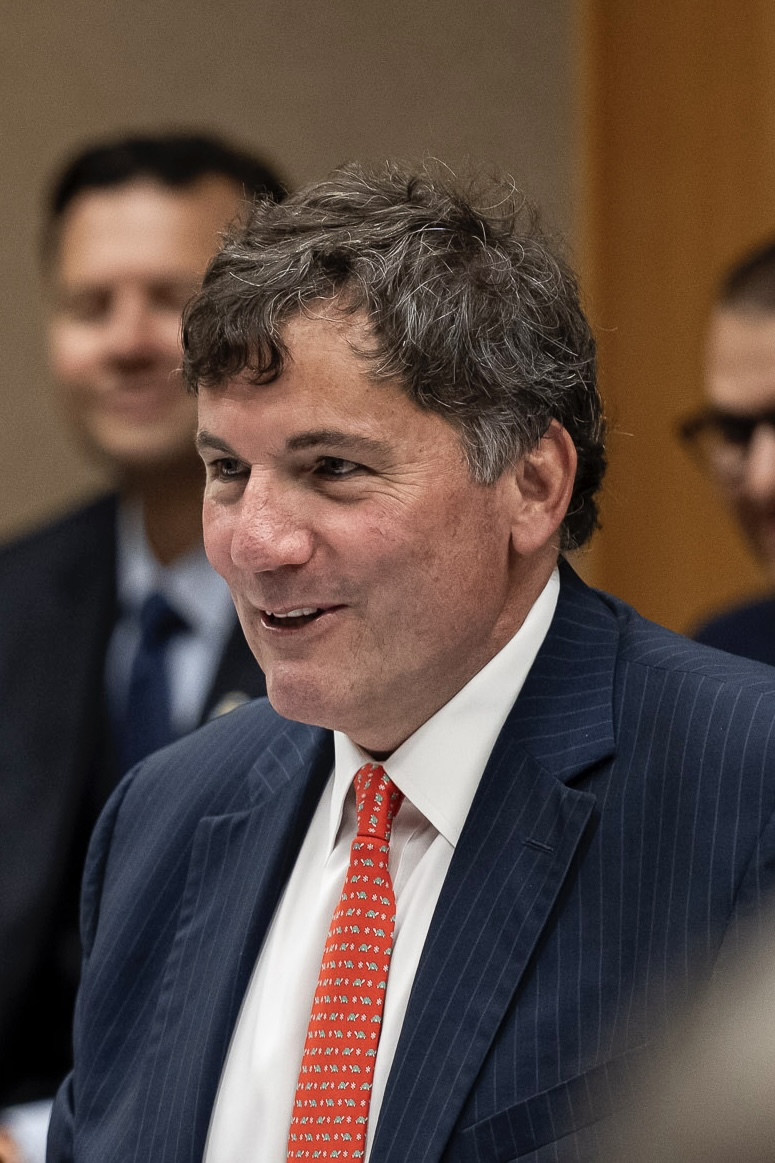
- Incumbent; Dominic LeBlanc (Note: As Minister responsible for Canada-U.S. Trade, Intergovernmental Affairs and One Canadian Economy) since August 18, 2020
- Intergovernmental Affairs Secretariat
- Style: The Honourable
- Member of: Cabinet; Privy Council
- Appointer: Monarch (represented by the governor general); on the advice of the prime minister
- Term length: At His Majesty's pleasure
- Inaugural holder: Marcel Massé
- Formation: 14 November 1993
- Salary: CA$299,900 (2024)
- Website: www.pco-bcp.gc.ca/aia/premier.asp

The minister of intergovernmental affairs (French: ministre des affaires intergouvernementales) is the minister of the Crown in the Canadian Cabinet who is responsible for the federal government's relations with the governments of the provinces and territories of Canada. The minister of intergovernmental affairs does not head a full-fledged department, but rather directs the Intergovernmental Affairs Secretariat within the Privy Council Office, and ministers have often been assigned additional duties.

Dominic LeBlanc currently holds the position as the minister responsible for Canada-U.S. trade, intergovernmental affairs and one Canadian economy.

Prior to the creation of full ministers responsible for this file, prime ministers occasionally appointed ministers of state for federal-provincial relations. That was the case from 1977 to 1980 and from 1986 to 1991. From 1991 to 1993, the Minister responsible for Constitutional Affairs served a similar role focused on intergovernmental negotiation of a package of constitutional reforms. The resulting package, the Charlottetown Accord, was defeated in a 1992 referendum.

Several provincial governments, such as Ontario, Manitoba and Quebec, have also created homologous ministerial positions responsible for relations with other provinces and the federal government.

== List of ministers ==
Key:

Liberal Party of Canada
Conservative Party of Canada

No.	Name	Term of office		Political party	Ministry
Minister of Intergovernmental Affairs
1	Marcel Massé	November 14, 1993	January 24, 1996	Liberal	26 (Chrétien)
2	Stéphane Dion	January 25, 1996	December 11, 2003	Liberal	26 (Chrétien)
3	Pierre Pettigrew	December 12, 2003	July 19, 2004	Liberal	27 (Martin)
4	Lucienne Robillard	July 20, 2004	February 5, 2006	Liberal	27 (Martin)
5	Michael Chong	February 6, 2006	November 27, 2006	Conservative	28 (Harper)
6	Peter Van Loan	November 27, 2006	January 3, 2007	Conservative	28 (Harper)
7	Rona Ambrose	January 4, 2007	October 30, 2008	Conservative	28 (Harper)
8	Josée Verner	October 30, 2008	May 18, 2011	Conservative	28 (Harper)
9	Peter Penashue	May 18, 2011	March 14, 2013	Conservative	28 (Harper)
Minister of Infrastructure, Communities and Intergovernmental Affairs
10	Denis Lebel	March 15, 2013	November 4, 2015	Conservative	28 (Harper)
Minister of Intergovernmental Affairs and Youth
11	Justin Trudeau	November 4, 2015	July 18, 2018	Liberal	29 (J. Trudeau)
Minister of Intergovernmental and Northern Affairs and Internal Trade
12	Dominic LeBlanc	July 18, 2018	November 20, 2019	Liberal	29 (J. Trudeau)
Minister of Intergovernmental Affairs
13	Chrystia Freeland	November 20, 2019	August 18, 2020	Liberal	29 (J. Trudeau)
(12)	Dominic LeBlanc	August 18, 2020	October 26, 2021	Liberal	29 (J. Trudeau)
Minister of Intergovernmental Affairs, Infrastructure and Communities
(12)	Dominic LeBlanc	October 26, 2021	July 26, 2023	Liberal	29 (J. Trudeau)
Minister of Public Safety, Democratic Institutions and Intergovernmental Affairs
(12)	Dominic LeBlanc	July 26, 2023	December 20, 2024	Liberal	29 (J. Trudeau)
Minister of Finance and Intergovernmental Affairs
(12)	Dominic LeBlanc	December 20, 2024	March 14, 2025	Liberal	29 (J. Trudeau)
Minister of International Trade and Intergovernmental Affairs
(12)	Dominic LeBlanc	March 14, 2025	May 13, 2025	Liberal	30 (Carney)
Minister responsible for Canada-U.S. Trade, Intergovernmental Affairs and One Canadian Economy
(12)	Dominic LeBlanc	May 13, 2025	Incumbent	Liberal	30 (Carney)
