= Federal Court (Canada) =

Canadian federal trial court

Federal Court Cour fédérale
- Coat of Arms of the Federal Court granted in 2008
- Established: 2003
- Jurisdiction: Canada
- Location: Sits across Canada
- Motto: Equity, Droit, Admiralty
- Composition method: Appointed by Governor General on advice of federal Cabinet
- Authorized by: Constitution Act, 1867; Federal Courts Act
- Appeals to: Federal Court of Appeal
- Judge term length: Mandatory retirement at age 75
- Number of positions: Chief Justice; Associate Chief Justice; 39 Judges; 9 Associate Judges
- Language: English and French
- Type of tribunal: Superior court of law, equity, admiralty and judicial review
- Website: Federal Court

Chief Justice
- Currently: Alan S. Diner
- Since: July 6, 2026

Associate Chief Justice
- Currently: Martine St-Louis
- Since: December 11, 2024

The Federal Court (French: Cour fédérale) is a Canadian trial court that hears cases arising under certain areas of federal law. The Federal Court is a superior court with nationwide jurisdiction.

== History ==
The court was created on July 2, 2003, by amendments to the Federal Court Act, which was renamed the Federal Courts Act. The amendments split the former Federal Court of Canada into two separate courts. The Trial Division of the former court became the Federal Court, while the Appeal Division became the Federal Court of Appeal.

The former Federal Court of Canada was the successor to the Exchequer Court of Canada, which was set up in 1875 by the Liberal government of Prime Minister Alexander Mackenzie. That court was primarily a revenue court, to govern disputes over federal taxation, and also civil claims against the federal government. It was succeeded in 1971 by the Federal Court of Canada, with the two divisions, trial and appellate, and a much-expanded jurisdiction, to cover matters such as immigration, patents and copyrights, and judicial review of federal boards, commissions and agencies. The 2003 amendments split the Federal Court of Canada into the current Federal Court and Federal Court of Appeal.

On October 24, 2008, the Federal Court was given its own armorial bearings by the Canadian Heraldic Authority, the third court in Canada to be given its own coat of arms – after the Court Martial Appeal Court of Canada and Ontario Superior Court of Justice. The coat of arms features a newly created fantastical creature, the winged sea caribou, as the supporters, representing the provision of justice on air, land and sea.

== Structure ==
=== Judges ===
The Federal Court consists of a chief justice, an associate chief justice, thirty-nine full-time judges, and nine associate judges. There is also a varying number of supernumerary positions, for judges who are approaching retirement.

Judges are appointed by the Governor in Council, namely the governor general of Canada acting on the advice of the federal Cabinet. To be appointed, a candidate must already be a judge of a superior court, or have at least ten years standing as a barrister or advocate in Canada. At least ten of the judges must come from Quebec.

The salaries of the judges and associate judges are reviewed every four years by the federal Judicial Compensation and Benefits Commission. As of April 1, 2025, the chief justice and associate chief justice receive $455,000 while other judges receive $414,900 annually.

Law clerks are hired for one-year terms to help the judges research and prepare decisions. They are generally assigned to a particular judge.

=== Sittings ===
Although based in Ottawa, the Federal Court holds sittings and motion days across Canada.

=== Administration ===
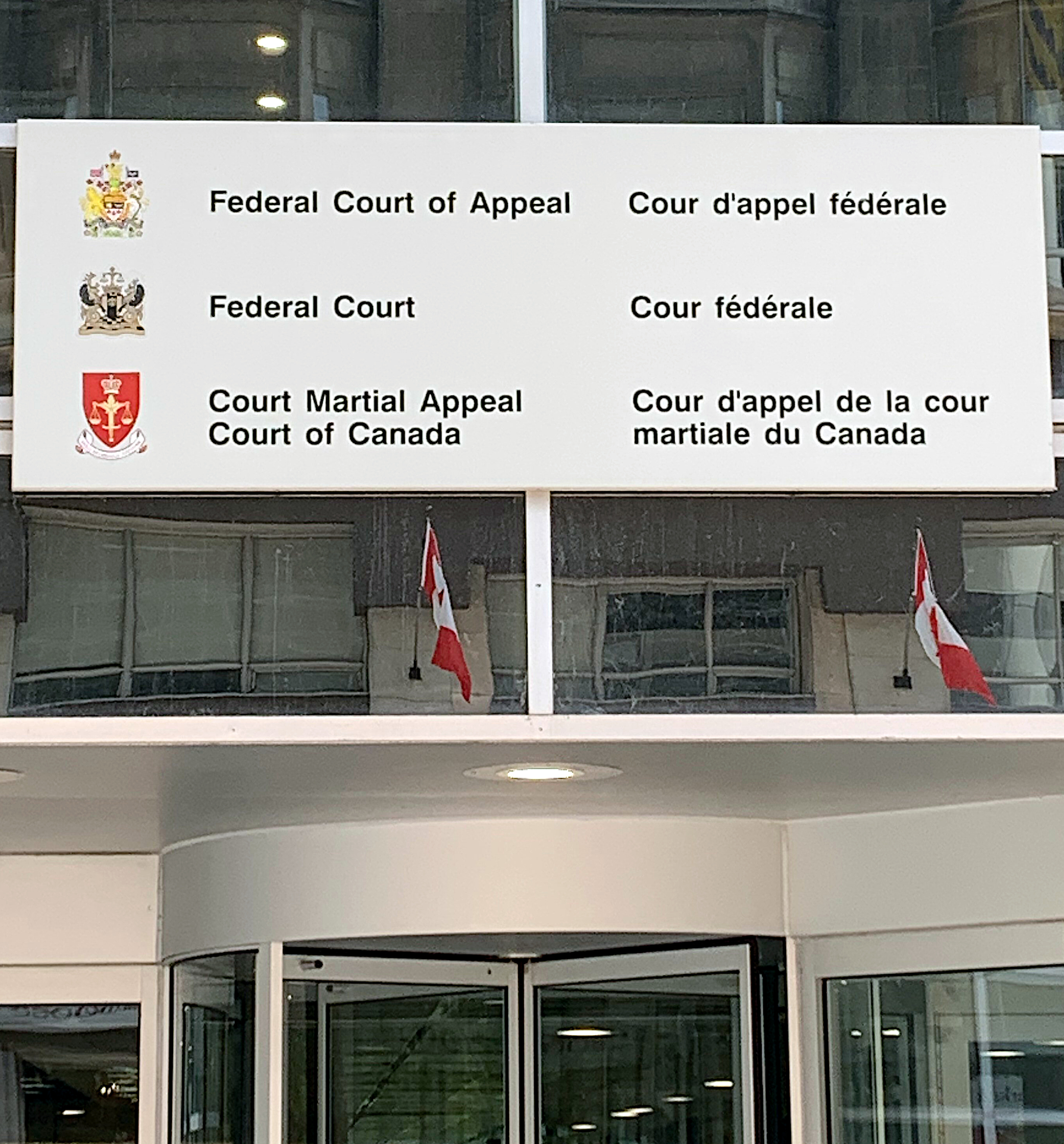
Registry offices for the federal courts, Ottawa

The Courts Administration Service provides registry services to several federal courts, including the Federal Court. The Federal Court Registry is located in Ottawa, with regional offices throughout the country. The Registry in Ottawa maintains all original court files, with certified copies maintained in regional offices. The Registry provides clerical services and other administrative support to the Court, and provides clerical services and procedural guidance to litigants.

== Jurisdiction ==
=== Statutory jurisdiction ===
The Federal Court’s authority comes from the Federal Courts Act. The court can only hear cases where a federal statute confers jurisdiction on the court to hear cases of that type. The subject-matter of a grant of jurisdiction must be within federal legislative authority.

Federal Court Proceedings — 2025
1. Immigration and refugee (82.2%)
2. Judicial review (7.10%)
3. Citizenship (4.40%)
4. Crown litigation (2.20%)
5. Intellectual property (1.80%)
6. Aboriginal (1.00%)
7. Admiralty (1.00%)
8. Other appeals and applications (0.30%)

The Federal Court's jurisdiction is civil in nature. Trials and applications are conducted by a single judge, and never with a jury. The court hears cases in the following areas of law:

- Administrative law
- Citizenship, immigration and refugee law
- Judicial review of Veterans Review and Appeal Board of Canada decisions
- Intellectual property law
- Admiralty (maritime) law
- National security law
- Cases involving federally-regulated industries such as railway tariff disputes
- Aboriginal law
- Claims against the Government of Canada.

These instances of jurisdiction may either be exclusive or concurrent with provincial superior courts, depending on the statute. Generally, the Federal Court has exclusive authority of judicial review over decisions made by federal boards, commissions, and administrative tribunals, other than those assigned to the Federal Court of Appeal. The jurisdiction over civil actions against the federal government is concurrent with the jurisdiction of the provincial superior courts.

In some cases, the Federal Court may have the power of judicial review over decisions by the federal Cabinet under particular statutory provisions. For example, in 2024, the Federal Court held that the federal Cabinet did not meet the statutory requirement to invoke the Emergencies Act to respond to the Freedom Convoy in 2022. The Federal Court of Appeal upheld the decision.

Because it is a superior court of national jurisdiction, judgments are enforceable across Canada.

=== Immigration matters ===
In 2020, more than 50% of the court's workload consisted of immigration and refugee cases, comprising 6,424 immigration-related matters commenced. By the end of 2024, that number had increased to 24,667 immigration-related matters commenced in 2024, which represented an increase of 44% over the year prior and quadruple the number of immigration-related cases prior to the COVID-19 pandemic.

In March 2025, the Court published a notice regarding the backlog and delays in document processing times, due primarily to the increase in the number of immigration-related matters. In May 2025, the court published a special order extending certain deadlines for key immigration documents in order to alleviate the burden for the judiciary and court staff.

=== Appeal process ===
Most decisions of the Federal Court may be appealed to the Federal Court of Appeal. However, decisions relating to immigration and citizenship may not be appealed unless the Federal Court certifies that the decision raises a "serious question of general importance".

In rare cases, the parties to a decision of the Federal Court can jointly seek to appeal directly to the Supreme Court of Canada, bypassing the Federal Court of Appeal in an appeal per saltum. The parties must both consent to the application, and the Supreme Court then decides whether to grant leave to appeal.

== Judges and associate judges ==
=== Chief Justice and Associate Chief Justice ===
Name	Appointed	Nominated by	Position prior to appointment
Alan Diner, Chief Justice	2026 (Chief Justice)	Carney	Lawyer, Baker McKenzie
Alan Diner, Chief Justice	2014 (Judge)	Harper	Lawyer, Baker McKenzie
Martine St-Louis, Associate Chief Justice	2024 (Associate Chief Justice)	Trudeau	Lawyer, McCarthy Tétrault
Martine St-Louis, Associate Chief Justice	2014 (Judge)	Harper	Lawyer, McCarthy Tétrault
Source: Federal Court — Members of the Court

=== Judges ===
Name	Appointed	Nominated by	Position prior to appointment
Russel W. Zinn (supernumerary)	2008	Harper	Lawyer, Ogilvy Renault
Jocelyne Gagné	2012 (Judge)	Harper	Lawyer, Lavery, de Billy
Jocelyne Gagné	2018–2024 (Associate Chief Justice)	Trudeau	Lawyer, Lavery, de Billy
Catherine Kane	2012	Harper	Senior General Counsel, Department of Justice (Canada)
Michael D. Manson (supernumerary)	2012	Harper	Lawyer, Smart & Biggar
Yvan Roy (supernumerary)	2012	Harper	Deputy Secretary to the Cabinet
Cecily Strickland	2012	Harper	Lawyer, Stewart McKelvey
Glennys L. McVeigh	2013	Harper	Senior Counsel, Public Prosecution Service of Canada
Simon Fothergill	2014	Harper	Counsel, Privy Council of Canada
Denis Gascon	2015	Harper	Lawyer, Norton Rose Fulbright
Richard F. Southcott	2015	Harper	Vice President and General Counsel, Irving Shipbuilding Inc.
Patrick K. Gleeson	2015	Harper	Senior Legal Advisor, Judge Advocate General
Ann Marie McDonald	2015	Harper	Lawyer, McInnes Cooper
Roger Lafrenière (supernumerary)	2017	Trudeau	Prothonotary, Federal Court
William F. Pentney	2017	Trudeau	Deputy Minister of Justice and Deputy Attorney General of Canada, Department of Justice (Canada)
Shirzad S. Ahmed	2017	Trudeau	Lawyer, sole practitioner
Sébastien Grammond	2017	Trudeau	Professor and Dean of Civil Law, University of Ottawa
Paul Favel	2017	Trudeau	Lawyer, McKercher LLP
John Norris	2018	Trudeau	Lawyer, sole practitioner
Nicholas McHaffie	2019	Trudeau	Lawyer, Stikeman Elliott
Janet M. Fuhrer	2019	Trudeau	Lawyer, Ridout & Maybee
Christine Pallotta	2020	Trudeau	Lawyer, Borden Ladner Gervais
Andrew D. Little	2020	Trudeau	Lawyer, Bennett Jones
Angela Furlanetto	2021	Trudeau	Prothonotary, Federal Court
Lobat Sadrehashemi	2021	Trudeau	Lawyer, Immigration and Refugee Legal Clinic, Vancouver
Avvy Yao-Yao Go	2021	Trudeau	Clinic Director, Chinese and Southeast Asian Legal Clinic, Ontario
Mandy Aylen	2021	Trudeau	Prothonotary, Federal Court
Guy Régimbald	2022	Trudeau	Lawyer, Gowling WLG
Ekaterina Tsimberis	2023	Trudeau	Lawyer, Smart & Biggar
Anne M. Turley	2023	Trudeau	Department of Justice (Canada)
Negar Azmudeh	2023	Trudeau	Immigration and Refugee Board of Canada
Phuong T.V. Ngo	2023	Trudeau	Gowling WLG
Allyson Whyte Nowak	2024	Trudeau	Norton Rose Fulbright Canada
Angus G. Grant	2024	Trudeau	Assistant Deputy Chairperson, Refugee Appeal Division of the Immigration and Refugee Board
Julie L. Blackhawk	2024	Trudeau	Lawyer, Department of Justice Canada
Michael Battista	2024	Trudeau	Founding counsel, Battista Migration Law Group
Benoit M. Duchesne	2024	Trudeau	Associate Judge, Federal Court
Love Saint-Fleur	2024	Trudeau	Coordinating Member, Refugee Appeal Division of the Immigration and Refugee Board
Meaghan M. Conroy	2024	Trudeau	MLT Aikins LLP
Danielle Ferron	2025	Trudeau	Langlois Lawyers LLP
Andrew J. Brouwer	2025	Trudeau	Lawyer, Legal Aid Ontario Refugee Law Office
Darren Thorne	2025	Trudeau	Member, Refugee Appeal Division of the Immigration and Refugee Board
Source: Federal Court — Members of the Court

=== Associate judges ===
Name	Appointed	Nominated by	Position prior to appointment
Martha Milczynski (supernumerary)	2003	Chrétien	Chair, Financial Services Commission of Ontario and the Financial Services Tribunal
Kathleen M. Ring	2017	Trudeau	General Counsel, Department of Justice Canada
Alexandra Steele	2018	Trudeau	Lawyer, Robic LLP
Sylvie M. Molgat	2018	Trudeau	Lawyer, Dubuc Osland
Catherine A. Coughlan	2021	Trudeau	Counsel, Department of Justice Canada
L.E. Trent Horne	2021	Trudeau	Lawyer, Aird & Berliss LLP
Michael Crinson	2023	Trudeau	Lawyer, Crinson Law LLP
John C. Cotter	2023	Trudeau	Lawyer, Osler, Hoskin & Harcourt
Catharine Moore	2024	Trudeau	Counsel, Department of Justice Canada
Kirkland G. Shannon	2025	Trudeau	Director General and Deputy Chief Executive Officer, Law Commission of Canada
Source: Federal Court — Members of the Court

== Former judges, prothonotaries, and associate judges ==
=== Chief Justice ===
Name	Term in office
Allan Lutfy	July 3, 2003 – September 30, 2011 (Note: Judge of the FC–TD, August 7, 1996; Associate Chief Justice of the Federal Court of Canada from December 8, 1999, until the 2003 reorganisation.)
Paul S. Crampton	December 15, 2011 – October 30, 2025 (Note: Judge of the Federal Court, November 26, 2009 – December 15, 2011.)
Source: Federal Court — Members of the Court

=== Judges ===
Name	Term in office
Paul U.C. Rouleau	July 3, 2003 – July 25, 2007 (Note: Judge of the FC–TD from August 5, 1982, until the 2003 reorganisation.)
Yvon Pinard	July 3, 2003 – July 1, 2013 (Note: Judge of the FC–TD from June 19, 1984, until the 2003 reorganisation.)
Max M. Teitlebaum	July 3, 2003 – January 27, 2007 (Note: Judge of the FC–TD from October 29, 1985, until the 2003 reorganisation.)
W. Andrew MacKay	July 3, 2003 – March 20, 2004 (Note: Judge of the FC–TD from September 2, 1988, until the 2003 reorganisation.)
Frederick E. Gibson	July 3, 2003 – August 30, 2008 (Note: Judge of the FC–TD from April 1, 1993, until the 2003 reorganisation.)
Sandra J. Simpson	July 3, 2003 – June 10, 2020 (Note: Judge of the FC–TD from June 10, 1993, until the 2003 reorganisation.)
Danièle Tremblay-Lamer	July 3, 2003 – August 31, 2017 (Note: Judge of the FC–TD from June 16, 1993, until the 2003 reorganisation.)
Douglas Campbell	July 3, 2002 – August 27, 2020 (Note: Judge of the FC–TD from December 8, 1995, until the 2003 reorganisation.)
James K. Hugessen	July 3, 2003 – July 26, 2008 (Note: Judge of the FC–TD from June 23, 1998, until the 2003 reorganisation.)
Pierre Blais, P.C.	July 3, 2003 – February 19, 2008 (Note: Judge of the FC–TD from June 23, 1998, until the 2003 reorganisation; appointed to the Federal Court of Appeal, February 19, 2008.)
François Lemieux	July 3, 2003 – October 5, 2012 (Note: Judge of the FC–TD from January 21, 1999, until the 2003 reorganisation.)
John A. O'Keefe	July 3, 2003 – November 30, 2015 (Note: Judge of the FC–TD from June 30, 1999, until the 2003 reorganisation.)
Elizabeth Heneghan	July 3, 2003 – February 9, 2026 (Note: Judge of the FC–TD from November 15, 1999, until the 2003 reorganisation.)
Eleanor Dawson	July 3, 2003 – December 26, 2009 (Note: Judge of the FC–TD from December 8, 1999, until the 2003 reorganisation; appointed to the Federal Court of Appeal December 28, 2009.)
Dolores Hansen	July 3, 2003 – May 31, 2016 (Note: Judge of the FC–TD from December 8, 1999, until the 2003 reorganisation.)
Edmond P. Blanchard	July 3, 2003 – June 27, 2014 (Note: Judge of the FC–TD from October 5, 2000, until the 2003 reorganisation.)
Michael A. Kelen	July 3, 2003 – June 12, 2016 (Note: Judge of the FC–TD from July 31, 2001 until the 2003 reorganisation.)
Michel Beaudry	July 3, 2003 – June 14, 2012 (Note: Judge of the FC–TD from January 25, 2002 until the 2003 reorganisation.)
Luc Martineau	July 3, 2003 – June 14, 2012
Carolyn Layden-Stevenson	July 3, 2003 – December 12, 2008 (Note: Judge of the FC–TD from January 25, 2002, until the 2003 reorganisation; appointed to the Federal Court of Appeal December 12, 2008.)
Simon Noël	July 3, 2003 – August 31, 2022 (Note: Judge of the FC–TD from August 8, 2002 until the 2003 reorganisation.)
Judith A. Snider	July 3, 2003 – October 15, 2013 (Note: Judge of the FC–TD from October 10, 2002 until the 2003 reorganisation.)
Johanne Gauthier	July 3, 2003 – October 21, 2011 (Note: Judge of the FC–TD from December 11, 2002, until the 2003 reorganisation; appointed to the Federal Court of Appeal October 21, 2011.)
James Russell	July 3, 2003 – August 31, 2020 (Note: Judge of the FC–TD from December 11, 2002 until the 2003 reorganisation.)
James O'Reilly	July 3, 2003 – January 9, 2025 (Note: Judge of the FC–TD from December 12, 2002 until the 2003 reorganisation.)
Konrad W. von Finckenstein	August 14, 2003 – January 25, 2007
Sean J. Harrington	September 16, 2003 – April 24, 2019
Richard Mosley	November 4, 2003 – May 9, 2024
Michel M.J. Shore	November 4, 2003 – April 30, 2022
Michael L. Phelan	November 19, 2003 – June 8, 2022
Anne L. Mactavish	November 19, 2003 – June 22, 2019 (Note: Appointed to the Federal Court of Appeal.)
Yves de Montigny	November 19, 2004 – June 19, 2015
Roger T. Hughes	June 1, 2005 – September 16, 2016
Robert L. Barnes	November 22, 2005 – November 22, 2021
Leonard S. Mandamin	April 27, 2007 – August 19, 2019
Robert M. Mainville	June 16, 2009 – June 18, 2010
David G. Near	June 19, 2009 – February 7, 2013
Richard Boivin	June 19, 2009 – April 10, 2014
Paul S. Crampton	November 26, 2009 – December 15, 2011 (Note: Appointed Chief Justice.)
Marie-Josée Bédard	April 14, 2010 – June 25, 2015
Donald J. Rennie	September 30, 2010 – February 26, 1015
André F.J. Scott	October 1, 2010 – January 30, 2014
Mary J.L. Gleason	December 15, 2011 – June 19, 2015
Peter B. Annis	February 7, 2013 – April 6, 2022
George R. Locke	April 10, 2014 – March 7, 2019
René LeBlanc	April 10, 2014 – April 28, 2020
Henry S. Brown	June 13, 2014 – January 2, 2026
Keith M. Boswell	June 30, 2014 – January 20, 2021
B. Richard Bell	February 5, 2015 – October 30, 2023
Robin Camp	June 26, 2015 – March 9, 2017
E. Susan Elliott	June 19, 2015 – June 1, 2024
Sylvie E. Roussel	June 19, 2015 – April 19, 2022
Elizabeth Walker	February 6, 2018 – January 26, 2024
Peter George Pamel	May 2, 2019 – September 20, 2024
Vanessa Rochester	August 4, 2021 – January 26, 2024
Source: Federal Court — Members of the Court

=== Prothonotaries ===
Name	Term in office
J. Alfred Preston	June 1, 1971 – March 13, 1984
Peter A.K. Giles	June 27, 1985 – March 28, 2002
Jacques Lefebvre	June 28, 1985 – February 2, 1999
John A. Hargreave	February 17, 1994 – January 4, 2006
Richard Morneau	November 28, 1995 – May 15, 2018
Roza Aronovitch	March 10, 1999 – April 2, 2015
Roger Lafrenière	April 1, 1999 – June 7, 2017 (Note: Appointed to the Federal Court.)
Mandy Aylen	June 16, 2016 – August 4, 2021
Angela Furlanetto	March 7, 2019 – February 26, 2021
Source: Federal Court — Members of the Court

=== Associate judges ===
Name	Term in office
Mireille Tabib	September 23, 2022 – July 31, 2023 (Note: Prothonotary from March 18, 2003 to creation of associate judge position, September 23, 2022.)
Kevin R. Aalto	September 23, 2022 – April 19, 2023 (Note: Prothonotary from May 7, 2007 to creation of associate judge position, September 23, 2022.)
Source: Federal Court — Members of the Court

=== Notes to tables ===
- "FC–TD" indicates "Federal Court of Canada–Trial Division"

== Coat of arms ==
Coat of arms of the Federal Court
Crest Issuant from a coronet of maple leaves and fleurs-de-lis, a balance Or Escutcheon Or on a Canadian pale Sable in chief three scrolls, two in saltire one in pale Or, bound by a ribbon chequy Or and Sable Supporters Two sea-caribou Or, that to the dexter male, that to the sinister female, both with wings and tarsi Sable and set on a cloth chequy Or and Sable above a bar wavy Or Motto EQUITY • DROIT • ADMIRALTY Banner A banner of the Arms within a bordure compony Or and Sable Badge On a pellet three scrolls, two in saltire one in pale Or, bound by a ribbon chequy Or and Sable Badge of Office for the Ushers of the Federal Court The Badge of the Court surmounting two batons in saltire Or tipped Sable Badge of Office for the Registrar of the Federal Court The Badge of the Court surmounting two quill pens in saltire Or

== See also ==
- Tax Court of Canada
