= Patterson Law =

Canadian full-service law firm

- Type: Limited Liability Partnership
- Industry: Law
- Founded: 1928
- Headquarters: Halifax, Nova Scotia, Canada
- Services: Legal advice
- Website: pattersonlaw.ca

Patterson Law LLP is a Canadian full-service law firm that serves Nova Scotia, and formerly served Atlantic Canada regionwide.

Uniquely among other Atlantic Canadian firms, Patterson Law is dispersed among both urban and rural offices, with two offices in Halifax, (with a downtown location adjacent to the Nova Scotia Supreme Court and Court of Appeal) and regional offices respectively in Bridgewater, New Glasgow, Pictou, and Truro providing service coverage to smaller town and rural clients.

Patterson Law is the fourth largest firm operating primarily within Atlantic Canada, after the 'big three' of Stewart McKelvey, McInnes Cooper, and Cox & Palmer.

== History ==
Patterson Law was founded in Truro in 1928 in the form of Patterson Smith Matthews & Grant, with Frank Harris Patterson and George Isaac Smith among its founding partners.

In 1986, Patterson merged with a Halifax-based firm to form Patterson Kitz, curiously showcasing a small town firm absorbing an urban office. By 1995, Patterson had merged with various regional offices to form Patterson Palmer Hunt Murphy, with offices located throughout the Atlantic Provinces.

The mid 2000's saw substantial upheaval in the Atlantic Canadian legal market, as a period of significant consolidation occurred in response to economic pressures, leading to the emergence of distinct and consolidated regional firms which fulfilled roles previously assumed by national firms based in Toronto. During this period, in 2005 and 2006, Patterson underwent a substantial restructuring and downsizing as the offices outside of Nova Scotia detached and merged to form the regional firm Cox & Palmer, while those that remained rejected merger and rebuilt the firm in its present form. This rearrangement distilled Atlantic Canada's four regional firms into three. Patterson refocused to become a provincially-focused and mid-sized firm with an urban and rural presence, occupying a distinct position within the Atlantic Canadian legal market.

By 2021, Patterson had expanded and merged with various law offices dispersed throughout mainland Nova Scotia, into its present form.

In 2026, Patterson Law received the Meritas 'Firm of the Year' Women's Leadership Award, among several hundred global firms, with women representing 74% of the firm's associates and 60% of its partners.

== Nova Scotia Mass Casualty Commission ==
Following the 2020 Nova Scotia shooting, the deadliest mass shooting in Canadian history, and subsequent Mass Casualty Commission, Patterson represented a majority of victims and their families to the Commission. Patterson lawyers publicly levied criticisms against the Mass Casualty Commission regarding continued delays, as well as procedural concerns around the public inquiry.

Patterson further represented the victims of the Nova Scotia shooting in launching a class action lawsuit against the Royal Canadian Mounted Police.

== Notable lawyers and alumni ==
- John Crosbie, politician and federal cabinet minister.
- Joel E. Fichaud, former Justice of the Nova Scotia Court of Appeal.
- Frank Harris Patterson, founding partner, prominent Nova Scotian lawyer and jurist.
- Edward Roberts, eleventh Lieutenant Governor of Newfoundland and Labrador.
- Jamie W. S. Saunders, former Justice of the Nova Scotia Court of Appeal.
- George Isaac Smith, founding partner, former Premier of Nova Scotia.
- Robert Stanfield, former Premier of Nova Scotia.
- Wyman W. Webb, Canadian judge serving on the Federal Court of Appeal.
- Doug Young, politician and federal cabinet minister.
