= Ridout & Maybee =

Canadian intellectual property law firm

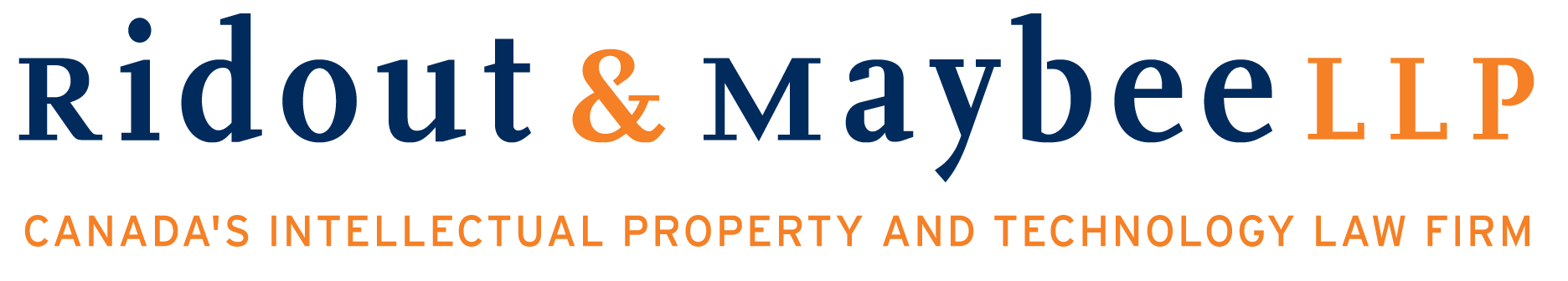
- No. of Offices: 3
- No. of Professionals: 35
- Area of Practice: Intellectual property
- Founded: 1893
- Company Type: Limited Liability Partnership
- Website: www.ridoutmaybee.com

Ridout & Maybee LLP was a Canadian intellectual property law firm with offices in Toronto, Ottawa, and Burlington. The firm had over 30 professionals, lawyers, and agents across all three offices and was one of Canada's longest operating IP firms. The firm was acquired in 2023 by Canadian intellectual property firm Smart & Biggar, part of the IPH group of international intellectual property service firms.

== History ==
1893 saw the beginning of what was Ridout & Maybee LLP—of John Gibbs Ridout and James Edward Maybee; however, the roots and reputation of the name date further back. Donald C. Ridout, a well-known, successful practitioner, began his practice the year of the confederation, 1867. He formed his first partnership in 1869 with an architect, James Smith, under the firm name of Ridout & Smith, Engineers and Architects

While a simple patent practice in Upper Canada, during a time other big names in the IP world were starting out—Smart, Biggar, Fetherstonhaugh, Dennison, and Riches, to name a few—Ridout and Smith were the Patent Agents responsible for Canada's first post-Confederation patent granted to W. Hamilton for a “Machine for Measuring Liquids”.

== The Evolution of the Ridout Practice ==
Smith departed from the firm in 1873, and the firm became Donald C. Ridout & Co. The firm at the time was described as “Patent Agents and (strangely) dealers in machinery”, a combination one will not find in today’s IP firms.

From 1876 to 1880, the name changed with the addition of George Aird, a civil engineer, to Ridout, Aird & Co., and reverted again to Donald C. Ridout & Co upon the departure of Aird in 1880.

Donald C. Ridout died in 1893, however, Charles H. Riches, a draughtsman at Donald Ridout & Co., purchased the goodwill to the firm and arranged for Donald C. Ridout Jr. to carry on the practice at 22 King Street East in Toronto.

James Edward Maybee—one of the 3 draughtsmen at Donald Ridout & Co. starting in 1882—formed a partnership with John Gibbs Ridout, brother to Donald Jr., upon the death of Donald Ridout Jr. under the name Ridout & Maybee.

It was at this time that the two draughtsmen began work on one of the only textbooks available on patents at the time titled “Ridout on Patents”. The textbook was later published in 1894 by Rowsell and Hutchison and it was paramount in the growth in popularity of the practice of patent law in Canada.

Like many strong partnerships, this one is not without its drama. History books explain how Maybee did most of the work, while Ridout received the profits. Upon John G. Ridout’s death in 1910, Maybee purchased the assets and goodwill of the company from Ridout’s widow and over the following years progressed in both profits and reputation. In the early 1930s, Maybee was approached by Lord Marks (of the British firm Marks & Clerk) with an interest in purchasing the business but declined his proposal.

J. Edward Maybee retired in 1940, leaving his son Gareth to continue the practice after purchasing all of the business’ assets. Gareth retired in January 1969 and was elected an honorary member of the Patent and Trademark Institute of Canada.

Since 2023, Ridout & Maybee has joined Smart & Biggar, Canada’s leading team for intellectual property, and now operates as one firm under the Smart & Biggar brand.

== Firm Growth ==
- The law firm of Kent & Edgar, founded in 1995, merged with the firm in 1999.
- The law firm of Dennis Moss and Peter Hammond merged with the firm in 2000.
- The firm of Gowan Intellectual Property merged with the firm in November 2015.

== Notable Mentions ==
- The firm's founder, James Edward Maybee, was the first president of the Intellectual Property Institute of Canada.
- Former partner (and now Federal Court Judge) Janet M. Fuhrer was the president of the Canadian Bar Association from 2015-2016.
- Partner Marcus Gallie is the current editor of the Canadian Patent Reporter - a publication established in 1942 that is published by Thomson Reuters. He has been the editor of this publication since 2008.

== Ranking ==
- Top 10 IP Boutique Law Firm - Canadian Lawyer Magazine (2012, 2013, 2014, 2015, 2016)
- Top Intellectual Property Law Firms - Chambers Global (2014)
- Canada's Life Sciences Law Firm of the Year - Corporate INTL Magazine (2010)
- Canada's Patent Law Firm of the Year - Corporate INTL Magazine (2011)
- Patent Contentious (Notable), Patent Prosecution (Tier 2), Trademark Contentious (Notable). Trademark Prosecution (Tier 2) - Managing Intellectual Property IP Stars (2017)
