= Russel W. Zinn =

Canadian Federal judge

- Incumbent
- Assumed office February 20, 2008

Personal details
- Born: Stratford, Ontario, Canada
- Education: Carleton University, University of Ottawa

Russel Zinn a Canadian Federal Court trial judge, was born in Stratford, Ontario. His education was at Carleton University, and the University of Ottawa. He was called to the Bar of Ontario in 1981. He became an associate and partner at Gowling & Henderson from 1981 to 1993. He left to establish his own law firm. He became a partner at Ogilvy Renault in 2001 and in 2006 was appointed senior partner. Before his appointment to the court, he appeared as counsel before the Supreme Court of Canada, Federal Court of Canada, Ontario Court of Appeal, Ontario Superior Court, Bermuda Court of Appeal, federal and provincial boards and tribunals. He is the author of The Law of Human Rights in Canada: Practice and Procedure (Canada Law Book, 1996) as well as numerous articles.

He was appointed judge of the Federal Court and member ex officio of the Federal Court of Appeal on February 20, 2008. He was appointed as a judge of the Court Martial Appeal Court of Canada on November 20, 2008.
