= Michael Manson =

Michael Manson may refer to:

- Michael Manson (politician)
- Michael Manson (judge)
- Michael Manson (rugby union)
