= Fixed election dates in Canada =

Method for scheduling Canadian elections

In Canada, the federal government and most provinces and territories have enacted legislation setting election dates, usually every four years, one year sooner than the constitutionally set five year maximum life of a parliament. However, the governor general, lieutenant governors, and commissioners still have the legal power to call a general election on the advice of the relevant first minister at any point before the fixed date. By-elections, used to fill vacancies in a legislature, are also not affected by fixed election dates.

== Legal ==
The laws enabling fixed election dates are established by simple majority votes and, so, any fixed election date could similarly be extended or abolished by another majority vote by the applicable parliament. They would not have authority to override the five-year limit imposed by the constitution on the term of a federal parliament (under both s. 50 of the Constitution Act, 1867 and s. 4 of the Canadian Charter of Rights and Freedoms) or a provincial/territorial legislature (s. 4 of the Charter), and this limit cannot be bypassed by the Charter's notwithstanding clause. However, the term of a legislature may be extended during a time of "real or apprehended war, invasion or insurrection", provided the extension is not opposed by more than one third of the members of the House of Commons (at the federal level) or the legislative assembly (at the provincial level).

== Federal ==
Section 50 of the Constitution Act, 1867, and section 4 of the Charter of Rights and Freedoms limit the maximum life of a federal parliament to five years following the return of the writs of election from the previous general election. Section 5 of the Charter provides that there must be sittings of each legislative assembly at least once in every 12-month period. By constitutional convention, an election must be called by the governor general following the mandatory dissolution of parliament.

The 39th Canadian Parliament passed An Act to Amend the Canada Elections Act, which received royal assent on May 3, 2007. It requires that each general election take place on the third Monday in October, in the fourth calendar year after the previous poll, starting on October 19, 2009. During the legislative process, the Liberal-dominated Senate added an amendment listing conditions under which an election date could be modified, in order to avoid clashes with religious holidays, municipal elections, and referendums; but, the House of Commons, led by Prime Minister Stephen Harper's Conservatives, rejected the amendment and the Senate did not pursue it.

When introducing the legislation, Harper stated that "fixed election dates prevent governments from calling snap elections for short-term political advantage. They level the playing field for all parties and the rules are clear for everybody." However, the prime minister is still free to request an election at any time, as the amendments to the Canada Elections Act clearly state, "nothing in this section affects the powers of the governor general, including the power to dissolve Parliament at the governor general's discretion". The change effectively altered only the maximum duration of a parliament.

This was illustrated by the dissolution of parliament at Harper's request on September 7, 2008, which led Democracy Watch to initiate proceedings in federal court against the Prime Minister, the Governor in Council, the Governor General, and the Attorney General of Canada, challenging the decision to call an election prior to the fixed election date. Judge Michel M.J. Shore dismissed the matter, saying the applicants "do not demonstrate a proper understanding of the separation of powers," since "the remedy for the applicant's contention is not for the Federal Court to decide, but, rather, one of the count of the ballot box". The court effectively found that the fixed election dates were not binding on the prime minister or legally enforceable by the courts.

With elections being held in October 2008 (after an early election call), and May 2011 (after a vote of non-confidence on a contempt of Parliament motion), the 41st parliament was the first to reach its maximum life under the revised law.

== Provincial ==
=== Alberta ===
The Legislature of Alberta, under a Progressive Conservative majority government, passed the Election Amendment Act, 2011, on December 8, 2011. It provided that a general election would be held between March 1 and May 31, 2012, and after that, in the same three-month period in the fourth calendar year after a general election. Amendments enacted by Jason Kenney's United Conservative government in 2021 eliminated the three-month period and fixed the date of the election on the last Monday of May. Further amendments enacted by Danielle Smith's UCP government in 2024 fixed the date of the election on the third Monday in October.

=== British Columbia ===
British Columbia was the first jurisdiction in Canada to adopt fixed election dates, doing so in 2001. The legislation amended the Constitution Act of British Columbia to require an election on May 17, 2005, and the second Tuesday in May every four years thereafter. In October 2017, the legislature passed amendments to the Constitution Act that changed the fixed election date from the second Tuesday of May to the third Saturday of October.

=== Manitoba ===
The Legislative Assembly of Manitoba passed acts in 2008 so as to stipulate that an election will be held on the first Tuesday in October in the fourth calendar year after election day; the first was in October 2011. The act also includes a provision to move the election if, as of January 1 of the election year, the election period would otherwise overlap with a federal election period; the provincial election is to be postponed until the third Tuesday of the following April.

=== New Brunswick ===
New Brunswick amended the Legislative Assembly Act in 2007 to introduce fixed election dates, causing an election to be held every four years, on the fourth Monday in September, the first was September 2010. The act was amended again in 2017 to change the fixed election date to the third Monday in October in the fourth calendar year following the last election.

=== Newfoundland and Labrador ===
The Legislative Assembly of Newfoundland and Labrador, with a majority held by the Progressive Conservative Party headed by Danny Williams, passed legislation in 2004, fixing the date of elections in Newfoundland and Labrador. General elections in the province are required to be held on the second Tuesday in October every four years, the first fixed date election occurred on October 9, 2007. In the event that a premier leaves office while the legislature is summoned, the new premier is required to, within 12 months of being appointed, advise the lieutenant governor to call an election.

=== Nova Scotia ===
Nova Scotia was the last province to introduce fixed election date legislation, and repealed the legislation before any fixed-date elections were held.

Following the 2021 provincial election, premier Tim Houston promised to implement fixed election date legislation, and later introduced a bill whereby elections would be held on the third Tuesday of July. However, Houston's government requested a snap election for November 26, 2024, before the first scheduled fixed date was reached. The legislation was repealed by the Houston government on March 26, 2025.

=== Ontario ===
Ontario had fixed election date legislation in effect from 2005 to 2025.

The Ontario Legislature, with a majority held by Dalton McGuinty's Liberals, passed the Election Statute Law Amendment Act, 2005, which requires elections to be held on the first Thursday in October every four years, starting with 2007, with contingencies in the event of conflicts with religious or culturally significant holidays. In December 2016, the Elections Act was amended, scheduling all subsequent provincial elections for "the first Thursday in June in the fourth calendar year following polling day in the most recent general election". These rules were generally adhered to, except for the 2014 election which was called early during a minority government, and the 2025 election which was called early despite a majority government.

The Doug Ford government announced a proposal on October 27, 2025, to eliminate fixed election dates as part of a series of changes to provincial election law; these changes went into effect on November 27.

=== Prince Edward Island ===
In 2007, Pat Binns' Progressive Conservatives (PCs) introduced a bill for fixed election dates, but an election was called before the bill could pass the legislature. Since the PCs had previously defeated a similar Liberal motion in 2006, Robert Ghiz, then leader of the opposition, said, "if they [the Progressive Conservatives] were concerned about accountability and fixed election dates they would have voted a year ago to have a fixed election date set for this election. They chose not to do that." However, when the Liberal Party held a majority in the legislative assembly, an act was in 2008 passed to amend the election act, mandating an election would be held every four years on the first Monday in October.

=== Quebec ===
The Quebec legislature passed a bill which received royal assent on June 14, 2013, that establishes fixed election dates held on the first Monday in October of the fourth calendar year following the end of the legislature. It also includes a provision to move the election to the first Monday of April in the fifth year, if the election period overlaps with a federal or municipal election period.

Had the National Assembly not been dissolved earlier and the federal and municipal elections remained as scheduled, the first fixed date election would have been held on October 3, 2016. However, on March 5, 2014, just over 18 months after the previous election, the assembly was dissolved by Lieutenant Governor Pierre Duchesne at the request of Premier Pauline Marois, who headed a minority government. The first fixed-date election was held on Monday, October 1, 2018.

=== Saskatchewan ===
The Saskatchewan Legislature amended The Legislative Assembly and Executive Council Act in 2007 to stipulate that an election will be held on the first Monday of November in the fourth calendar year following the previous election. In 2018 the act was changed to specify the last Monday of October. The first fixed election was in November 2011. The act also includes a provision to move the election if the election period overlaps with a federal election period; the provincial election is to be postponed until the first Monday of the following April.

== Territorial ==
=== Northwest Territories ===
The Northwest Territories' Elections and Plebiscite Act requires elections on the first Tuesday in October every four years, starting with 2007. A strong motivation for this law was the practical difficulties of holding an election during the Arctic winter.

=== Nunavut ===
The date for the 4th Nunavut general election, held in 2013, was set almost a year prior. The following year the legislative assembly amended the Nunavut Elections Act to mandate an election be held on the last Monday in October in the fourth calendar year following the previous election day. The first election to be held under these rules took place October 30, 2017.

=== Yukon ===
Under Section 50.01 of the Elections Act, elections in Yukon are scheduled for the first Monday of November in the fourth year following the date of the previous election.

Yukon was the last territory to introduce fixed election date legislation. While campaigning in 2016 the Yukon Liberal Party, and leader Sandy Silver, promised fixed election dates amongst other electoral reform. Amendments to the territory's Elections Act providing for fixed election dates were passed in December 2020, and came into effect following the 2021 Yukon general election.

== Municipal ==
Municipalities are under the jurisdiction of the provinces and territories. As of 2024, all ten provinces and two of three territories have four-year terms of office for municipal officeholders and hold the associated elections on a fixed date, separate from any fixed election date for the provincial or territorial government. The Northwest Territories differs only in that municipalities have a two- or three-year term of office depending on the type.

Unlike at the federal and provincial/territorial levels, there is no procedure whereby a municipal government can call early council-wide elections, or be forced to do so following a non-confidence vote.

== Next elections ==
Assuming that a government does not fall on a non-confidence vote, that the prime minister or premier does not request an early election, and that the legislature's lifetime is not extended as in the case of the 12th Canadian Parliament, the fixed election date legislation requires the next election for each jurisdiction to be held on the following dates:

Jurisdiction	Election date
Federal	October 15, 2029
Alberta	October 18, 2027
British Columbia	October 19, 2030
Manitoba	October 5, 2027
New Brunswick	October 16, 2028
Newfoundland and Labrador	October 9, 2029
Nova Scotia	Legislature expires December 7, 2029
Northwest Territories	October 5, 2027
Nunavut	October 29, 2029
Ontario	Legislature expires March 7, 2030
Prince Edward Island	October 4, 2027
Quebec	October 7, 2030
Saskatchewan	October 30, 2028
Yukon	November 5, 2029

Italics indicates no fixed date legislation.
