= Yvan Roy =

Yvan Roy may refer to:

- Yvan Roy (footballer), French football player and manager
- Yvan Roy (justice), justice in the Federal Court of Canada and former lawyer
