= Hatfield Hall =

Hatfield Hall may refer to:

- Hatfield Hall (Cobourg), private school for girls in Cobourg, Ontario
- Antoinette Hatfield Hall, theatre complex in Portland, Oregon
- old name for Hatfield College, Durham
- the theatre in Rose-Hulman Institute of Technology, Terre Haute, Indiana
