= George R. Locke =

Canadian judge

Judge of the Federal Court of Appeal of Canada
- Incumbent
- Assumed office March 7, 2019

George R. Locke is a justice in the Federal Court of Appeal of Canada.
