= Harold Fox =

Harold Fox may refer to:

- Harold Fox (basketball) (born 1949), basketball player
- Harold C. Fox, trumpeter and clothier who popularized the zoot suit
- Harold G. Fox (1896–1970), Canadian lawyer, scholar, and businessman
- Harold Munro Fox (1889–1967), British zoologist
