= Justice Strickland =

Justice Strickland may refer to:

- Cecily Strickland (born 1959), justice of the Federal Court of Canada
- Obed F. Strickland (1833–1887), justice of the Supreme Court of the Utah Territory
