= John Maxwell Evans =

Canadian judge

Canadian Federal Court of Appeal

John Maxwell Evans (born August 4, 1942) is a former judge of the Canadian Federal Court of Appeal.

In 2013, Evans was listed as a NAFTA adjudicator.
