= Russel S. Smart =

Russel Sutherland Smart
- Russel S. Smart, c. 1928, in his Ottawa office
- Born: June 20, 1885; Winnipeg, Manitoba, Canada
- Died: May 18, 1944 (aged 58); Ottawa, Ontario, Canada
- Education: University of Toronto; Queen's University; McGill University
- Occupation: lawyer

Russel Sutherland Smart, QC (June 20, 1885 – May 18, 1945) was a Canadian intellectual property lawyer who founded the law firm Smart & Biggar.

== Early life and education ==
Russel S. Smart was born in Winnipeg, Manitoba, on June 20, 1885, to George Alexander Smart and his wife. His mother died when he was six months old, and he was abandoned by his father who left to Atlanta, Georgia, while he was a child. Smart was raised by two maternal aunts in reduced circumstances.

Despite his circumstance, Smart attended the School of Practical Science at the University of Toronto, paying for his tuition by working as a packing manager at a local Woolworth's when he was not in class. He graduated with a diploma in mechanical engineering at the School in 1904.

While he was Toronto, Smart came across an advertisement for a job as a manager of the Ottawa office of the patent agency Fetherstonhaugh & Co. With no other job prospects, Smart decided to apply for the job, and was offered the position by F. B. Fetherstonhaugh on January 1, 1904. After graduation, Smart moved to Ottawa to begin practice as a patent attorney. Around the same time, he received a B.A. from Queen's University through extramural courses.

In 1908, he married Emma Louise "Louie" Parr.

== Legal career ==
At first, Smart practiced only as a patent agent with Fetherstonhaugh & Co. However, as patent litigation became more prevalent in the early part of the 20th century, it was necessary for Smart to hire local lawyers to represent his clients before the Exchequer Court and Supreme Court of Canada. He therefore decided to take a correspondence course in law at McGill University, and was called to the Bar of Quebec in 1911. He later returned to the University of Toronto to complete a fourth year in the mechanical engineering program (which was optional when Smart was originally enrolled at the School of Practical Science) to receive his Bachelor of Applied Science degree in 1913.

Thereafter, Smart began to represent his own clients in court, and soon gained prominence as a leading patent and trademark lawyer. By 1913 he was named a partner of the law firm, which began to offer services under the name Fetherstonhaugh & Smart while continuing to be closely associated with the patent agency Fetherstonhaugh & Co.

In Ottawa, Smart met the prominent lawyer and politician Harold Fisher, and together they published in 1914 one of the first comprehensive treatises on Canadian patent law. In 1917, Smart published a treatise on the law of trademarks and designs, which was also one of the first such texts on Canadian law.

Smart's litigation practice was extremely busy. He appeared in over 100 reported cases relating to intellectual property, and he regularly visited England to appear before the Privy Council on appeals. By 1926, Smart's legal practice had grown to the extent that he decided it was necessary to bring in an experienced litigator to share his workload. Smart turned to Oliver Mowat Biggar, then the Chief Electoral Officer of Canada, and whom he had previously met as opposing counsel in 1924. In 1927, the law firm became known as Smart & Biggar, which has continued to this day as a leading intellectual property firm in Canada.

== Personal life and family ==
Smart's reputation and his successful career firmly placed him in the classes of the nouveau riche, as he and his family began to mingle with members of Ottawa's privileged political and social class beginning in the late 1920s. The Smarts socialized with diplomats, civil servants, lawyers, politicians, and many future literary and cultural figures. Among the Smarts' close friends were Arthur Bourinot, a Canadian lawyer and poet, and Sir Stafford Cripps, a prominent British lawyer and politician who later became Chancellor of the Exchequer.

Smart purchased a summer cottage by Lake Kingsmere, in the Gatineau Hills a short drive north of Ottawa on a piece of property adjacent to the vast estates of Prime Minister William Lyon Mackenzie King. The Smarts named their cottage "The Barge" because it was allegedly shaped like the hull of a ship. It was at this summer cottage where Smart's wife, Louie, would play hostess to a number of prominent guests who later became important figures in Canada, including Lester B. Pearson, future Prime Minister of Canada, Charles Ritchie, a civil servant and later a prominent diplomat, Graham Spry, a writer and broadcast pioneer who later helped form the Canadian Radio Broadcasting Commission and who was an important figure in the Co-operative Commonwealth Federation, and Norman Robertson, a diplomat and advisor to Mackenzie King.

Smart had four children with Louie. Helen (b. 1909), the eldest, married Alan Swabey in 1931. Swabey was an American football player who played for the McGill Redmen. He was brought into Smart's firm as a patent clerk and later founded his own patent agency in Montreal known as Alan Swabey & Co. Swabey's firm eventually became Swabey Ogilvy Renault (the patent agency associated with Ogilvy Renault), which in turn merged with various firms to form Norton Rose Fulbright Canada. Helen and Alan Swabey later divorced, and she was remarried to Averill Stowell. Elizabeth (b. 1913, also known as "Betty") was well known as a socialite in Ottawa in her early life, a pursuit encouraged by her mother, but she was later better known as a poet and writer. Her most famous work was her semi-autobiographical poetic novel, By Grand Central Station I Sat Down and Wept, which detailed her romance with the poet George Barker. Jane (b. 1915), known better as Jane Marsh Beveridge, became a sculptor, composer, writer, and filmmaker who was one of the pioneers at the National Film Board of Canada. Russel Jr. (b. 1921), his only son, served overseas in the Canadian Forces during World War II, and later joined Smart & Biggar, eventually taking over as its managing partner.

Smart was also a president of the Ottawa Drama League.

== Late life ==
During World War II, Smart was appointed as the real property administrator for the Wartime Prices and Trade Board.

Smart died in Ottawa on May 18, 1944, after a brief illness. His funeral was attended by numerous politicians and civil servants.
