= Yves de Montigny =

Canadian Federal Court judge

Chief Justice of the Federal Court of Appeal
- Incumbent
- Assumed office November 9, 2023

Judge of the Federal Court of Appeal
- In office June 19, 2015 – November 9, 2023

Judge of the Federal Court
- In office November 18, 2004 – June 19, 2015

Personal details
- Born: July 12, 1955 (age 70) Montreal, Quebec

Yves de Montigny (born July 12, 1955) is the chief justice of the Federal Court of Appeal of Canada. He was initially appointed to the Federal Court, the trial court, in 2004, and was elevated to the Court of Appeal in 2015. He was appointed as the chief justice on November 6, 2023.
