= Frank Harris Patterson =

Nova Scotian lawyer (1891–1976)

Portrait Photograph of the Honourable Frank Patterson

Frank Harris Patterson (1891 – 1976) was a Nova Scotian lawyer, jurist and historian.

Born in Tatamagouche, Nova Scotia, Patterson was called to the Bar of Nova Scotia in 1921.

In 1928, Patterson was a founder of the law firm Patterson Smith Matthews & Grant, which continues to bear his name as Patterson Law LLP. In its present form, Patterson Law LLP is a major regional law firm with offices throughout Nova Scotia.

In 1958, he was appointed to the Supreme Court bench, retiring in 1965. A well-known Nova Scotia historian, Patterson wrote many books and articles, including A History of Tatamagouche and Acadian Tatamagouche and Fort Franklin. He lived most of his life in Truro, Nova Scotia, and died there in 1976.

== See also ==
- Nova Scotia Supreme Court
