= David G. Near =

Canadian judge

Judge of the Federal Court of Appeal of Canada
- Incumbent
- Assumed office February 8, 2013
- Nominated by: Justin Trudeau
- Preceded by: J. M. Evans

Personal details
- Education: Mount Allison University (BA); Queen's University at Kingston (MA); University of Windsor (LLB)

David G. Near is a Canadian jurist serving as a justice in the Federal Court of Appeal.

== Education ==
Near earned a Bachelor of Arts degree from Mount Allison University in 1975, a Master of Arts from the Queen's University at Kingston in 1978, and a Bachelor of Laws from the University of Windsor Faculty of Law in 1981.

== Career ==
Near was admitted to the Ontario Bar Association in 1983 and practiced criminal and civil law at Crawford, Farr, Lewis, Worling and Booth. He later served as chief of staff to the minister of consumer and corporate affairs and solicitor general of Canada. From 1990 to 2009, he served as senior counsel for the Legal Services Unit of Environment Canada. He also served as a senior advisor in the Department of Justice.
