= Elizabeth Heneghan =

Judge of the Federal Court of Canada
- In office July 2, 2003 – February 9, 2026

Elizabeth Heneghan was a judge of the Federal Court of Canada. She resigned in February 2026.
