= Jim Thistle =

Canadian politician

Jim Thistle (c. 1955 – March 3, 2016) was a Canadian lawyer and politician, who was a key negotiator of the 1985 Atlantic Accord between the Government of Canada and the Government of Newfoundland and Labrador over the development of offshore oil and gas fields. Thistle also served as a former Vice President of the Liberal Party of Newfoundland and Labrador. Additionally, he held office as both the Deputy Minister of Justice and Deputy Attorney General of Newfoundland and Labrador during his career.

Thistle was a partner at the St. John's office of the McInnes Cooper law firm. He was an important negotiator and arbitrator for the 1985 Atlantic Accord, which set the standards for the exploitation of offshore oil and natural gas reserves in Newfoundland's provincial waters. According to his law firm, "Thistle worked with every major oil and gas mining company in business with the province."

He was a member of Fellow of the Chartered Institute of Arbitrators.

Jim Thistle died from Lou Gehrig's disease on March 3, 2016, at the age of 61.
