= René LeBlanc =

Canadian judge

Judge of the Federal Court of Appeal of Canada
- Incumbent
- Assumed office April 29, 2020

René LeBlanc is a justice with the Federal Court of Appeal of Canada, having been appointed in April 2020.

== Early life and education ==
LeBlanc received a Bachelor of Civil Law from Université Laval in 1979 and was called to the Barreau du Québec in 1980. After his call to the bar, he worked in private practice in the firm Lazarovitch, Cannon, Lemelin & Rourke in Québec City before joining the Legal Services Unit of the Secretary of State of Canada in 1982.

In 1986, he became a litigation lawyer with the Department of Justice Canada as a litigator and in 2006, he was appointed Senior General Counsel.

In April 2014, LeBlanc was appointed as a Judge of the Federal Court.
