= Harold G. Fox =

Canadian lawyer, scholar, and businessman

Harold George Fox
- Born: 1896; Toronto, Ontario, Canada
- Died: 1970 (aged 73–74); London, England
- Occupations: Lawyer, scholar, businessman

Harold George Fox, QC (1896 – 1970) was a Canadian lawyer, scholar, and businessman. He was widely known for his texts on Canadian intellectual property law, litigation, and for his involvement in the zipper business (first as a lawyer and later as managing director of the Lightning Fastener Company in association with Gideon Sundback).

== Biography ==
=== Early life and career ===
Harold Fox was born in 1896 in Toronto, Ontario, Canada. He attended the University of King's College and Osgoode Hall Law School. He was called to the Bar of Ontario in 1919, and began practice as an intellectual property lawyer with Fetherstonhaugh & Co (now known as Smart & Biggar/Fetherstonhaugh) in Toronto. He advanced quickly in the profession, becoming a partner of the firm in 1923 along with Frederick Fetherstonhaugh to form Fetherstonhaugh & Fox. However, by 1927, Fox had left to start his own practice. In 1937, he was created a King's Counsel.

Fox married Ethel Croston in England in 1934, but they had no children together.

=== Legal writings ===
Fox published his first book with Fetherstonhaugh in 1926, titled The Law and Practice of Letters Patent of Invention in Canada. By the 1940s, Fox had published three landmark treatises on intellectual property, one each on Canadian patent law, copyright law, and trademark law. These books were some of the first comprehensive treatises on the subject of Canadian intellectual property law, and have been widely cited since by courts and academics. He also published a series of annotated law reports entitled "Fox's Patent Cases" focusing on Canadian intellectual property law, which was widely distributed in Canada, the United States, and the United Kingdom.

=== Lightning Fastener Company ===
As a lawyer, Fox was involved in numerous intellectual property law cases, the most famous of which were the "zipper" cases on behalf of the Lightning Fastener Company. Gideon Sundback, the owner of numerous patents related to zippers, had set up the Lightning Fastener Company in St. Catharines, Ontario to manufacture and sell zippers. Sundback retained Fox to protect his patent rights, which resulted in a series of landmark cases decided at the Supreme Court of Canada and the Privy Council. Sundback, however, could not afford to pay Fox in cash, and so arranged to pay for his legal services in shares of the Lightning Fastener Company. By the late 1930s, Fox stepped back from his role as lawyer and became the managing director of the company, relocating to St. Catharine's at the same time. He saw the company through the Second World War, after which the company became greatly profitable. At one point, the Lightning Fastener Company owned 60% of the global zipper market.

=== Further education and honours ===
Fox earned a Ph.D. from the University of Toronto in 1940, during his time away from full-time legal practice. He also served as an honorary lecturer at the University of Toronto. In 1945, he earned an LLD.

By the post-war era, Fox had become widely known as an expert in intellectual property law across the English-speaking world. His frequent appearances before courts in both Canada and England earned him significant honours. In 1956, he was admitted to the Freedom of the City of London. He was also admitted to the Livery of the Worshipful Company of Stationers and Newspaper Makers in 1958. In 1961, the Middle Temple named him an Honorary Bencher. The following year, he was awarded Doctor of Laws, honoris causa by Osgoode Hall.

=== Return to legal practice ===
In 1949, Fox returned to legal practice when Senator Salter Hayden of McCarthy & McCarthy (later known as McCarthy Tétrault) offered him a position as counsel in its fledgling intellectual property group. McCarthy had become acquainted with Fox as the opposing counsel in the zipper cases, and was familiar with his work. Fox helped McCarthy & McCarthy build a formidable intellectual property practice, attracting established intellectual property practitioners as well as helping to develop a new generation of lawyers and patent agents. Many of Fox's colleagues became prominent practitioners in the field, including Donald F. Sim and Roger T. Hughes. In 1970, however, the McCarthys group (along with Fox) left to create its own boutique firm called Sim, Hughes (now known as Sim, Lowman, Ashton & McKay).

== Late life and legacy ==
Fox's later years were plagued with ill health. He died on September 29, 1970, while vacationing in London, England at the age of 74. He is buried in St. James Cemetery.

Fox amassed a small fortune through his association with the Lightning Fastener Company. He left much of his estate to the Harold G. Fox Education Fund, a trust he created in 1966 to make donations for student bursaries, scholarships, and facilities for legal education. On the recommendation of Fox and his wife, the Fund established a scholarship for graduates in law from Ontario to study as pupils in chambers of English barristers. Since 1985, the Fund has facilitated an exchange between England and Ontario, whereby English students would be placed in major Ontario law firms and Ontario law graduates would complete a pupillage with the Middle Temple, where Fox was an Honorary Bencher.

Fox's name has also lives on with the Harold G. Fox Intellectual Property Moot, an annual mooting competition of Canadian law schools on the subject of intellectual property.

== Coat of Arms ==
Coat of arms of Harold G. Fox

Notes
The announcement of the Letters Patent was made on November 17, 2018, in Volume 152, page 899 of the Canada Gazette.
Granted
20 January 1939
Crest
A fox passant in front of a moon in her complement rising proper.
Escutcheon
Azure three foxes’ brushes palewise proper.
Supporters
As with the Royal Arms differenced by a like Coronet and Label.
Symbolism
The fox’s brushes, or tails, and the fox allude to Mr. Fox’s surname.

== Publications ==
- The Law and Practice of Letters Patent of Invention in Canada (1926), with Frederick B. Fetherstonhaugh
- The Canadian Law and Practice Relating to Letters Patent for Inventions (1937), also known as Fox on Patents
  - 4th edition published 1969
- The Canadian Law of Copyright and Industrial Designs (1944), also known as Fox on Copyright
  - 2nd edition published 1967
- The Canadian Law of Trade Marks and Unfair Competition (1956), also known as Fox on Trade-marks
  - 3rd edition published 1972 (posthumously)
- Monopolies and Patents: A Study of the History and Future of the Patent Monopoly (1947)
