= Wyman W. Webb =

Federal Court of Appeal
- Incumbent
- Assumed office October 5, 2012

Tax Court of Canada
- In office November 23, 2006 – October 5, 2012

Personal details
- Education: Mount Allison University, Dalhousie University

Wyman W. Webb is a Canadian judge serving on the Federal Court of Appeal since 2012.

== Early life and education ==
Webb grew up in Mahone Bay, Nova Scotia. In 1978, Webb received a Bachelor of Science from Mount Allison University. He graduated from Dalhousie University with a Bachelor of Laws and a Master of Business Administration in 1982.

Webb was a partner with Patterson Law from 1982 to his appointment to the Tax Court in 2006, focusing on national tax law, commercial law and tax litigation.
