= Elizabeth Smart (Canadian author) =

Canadian poet and novelist (1913–1986)

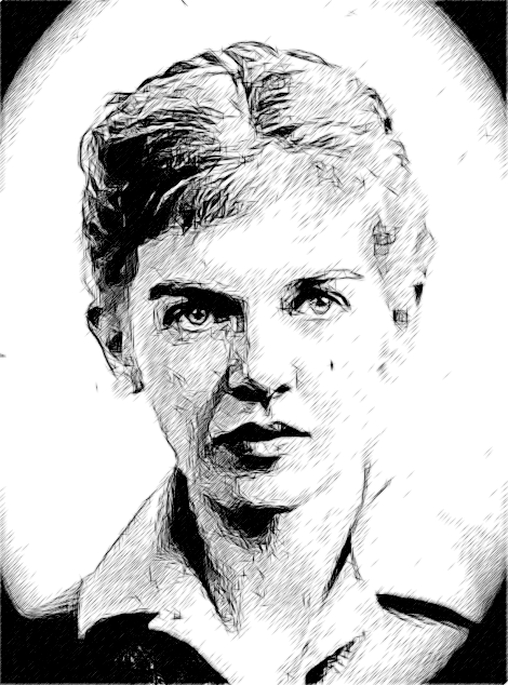
- Born: December 27, 1913; Ottawa, Ontario, Canada
- Died: March 4, 1986 (aged 72); London, England, United Kingdom
- Occupation: Writer

Elizabeth Smart (December 27, 1913 – March 4, 1986) was a Canadian poet and novelist. Her best-known work is the novel By Grand Central Station I Sat Down and Wept (1945), an extended prose poem inspired by her romance with the poet George Barker.

== Early life and education ==
Smart was born to a prominent family in Ottawa, Ontario; her father, Russel Smart, was a lawyer, and the family had a summer house on Kingsmere Lake located next door to the future Prime Minister of Canada, William Lyon Mackenzie King. Her sister, Jane became a filmmaker, teacher and sculptor.

Smart attended the Ottawa Normal School in her formative years, but was soon transferred to the Elmwood School, a private prep school for girls located in an affluent Ottawa neighbourhood. She later attended Hatfield Hall in Cobourg, Ontario for secondary school.

At the age of 11, Smart was confined to bed for a year due to a misdiagnosed "leaky heart valve". She began writing at an early age, publishing her first poem at the age of 10 and compiling a collection of poetry at 15. In her youth, she often kept regular journals, a habit she would keep up throughout most of her life.

Smart grew up among the social elite of Ottawa through her father's connections as a lawyer. Her mother often hosted parties for prominent politicians and civil servants. As a result, Smart socialized with many members of Ottawa's political class who were or would become important figures in Canadian history, including acquaintances such as Graham Spry, Charles Ritchie, Lester B. Pearson, and William Lyon Mackenzie King.

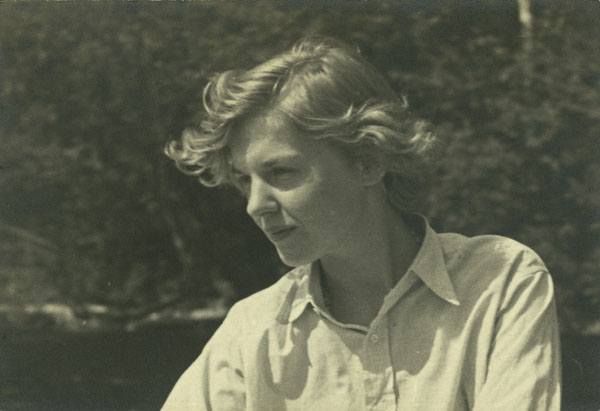
Elizabeth Smart at her family's summer cottage near Kingsmere, c. 1930

At the age of 18, following graduation from secondary school, Smart traveled to England to study music at the University of London.

In 1937, Smart took a job as secretary to the noted Mrs. Alfred Watt, head of the Associated Country Women of the World, an international organization for rural women, travelling extensively throughout the world accompanying Watt to various conferences. It was during this time that Smart happened across a book of poetry by George Barker, immediately falling in love not only with the poetry, but with the man himself.

After her travels with Mrs. Watt, Smart returned to Ottawa, where she spent six months writing society notes for the women's page of The Ottawa Journal. At parties she would often ask about Barker, saying she wanted to meet and marry him. Soon Smart began a correspondence with the poet.

== Relationship with George Barker ==
Eager to launch her writing career, Smart quit the Journal and left Ottawa for good. Traveling on her own, she visited New York, Mexico and California, joining a writers' colony at Big Sur. While there, Smart made contact with Barker through Lawrence Durrell, paying to fly Barker and his wife to the United States from Japan where he was teaching. Soon after meeting, they began a tumultuous affair which was to last for years.

In 1941, after becoming pregnant, Smart returned to Canada, settling in Pender Harbour, British Columbia to have the child she would name Georgina. Barker attempted to visit her in Canada, but Smart's family influenced government officials: he was stopped at the border and turned back because of "moral turpitude". During this time Smart produced her best-known work, By Grand Central Station I Sat Down and Wept (1945).

Smart soon returned to the United States and began work as a file clerk for the British embassy in Washington. Two years later, in 1943, during the height of the war, she sailed to the United Kingdom to join Barker. There she gave birth to their second child, Christopher Barker, and obtained employment at the British Ministry of Defence to support her children.

Just 2000 copies of By Grand Central Station I Sat Down and Wept were published in 1945 by Editions Poetry London, but it did not achieve popularity until its paperback reissue in 1966.

It is a fictional work, largely based on Smart's affair with Barker up until that point. "The power of emotion to transform one's perspective on the world," a 2010 Open Letters Monthly review of the novel states, "is the theme of this wildly poetic novel. The inspiration for Smart's classic work of prose poetry is just as famous as the book itself.

Smart's mother Louise ("Louie") was not pleased with the book. Again availing influence with government officials, she led a successful campaign to have its publication banned in Canada. Of those copies that made their way into the country from overseas, Louise Smart bought up as many as she could find and had them burned.

Barker visited Smart often in London where she worked. She became pregnant again, and was fired from the Ministry of Information. Their affair produced two more children (Sebastian, born 1945, and Rose Emma, born 1947). Through it all Barker, who was Catholic, said he would leave his wife for Smart, but this never happened (he was to have fifteen children by several different women). They lived a bohemian lifestyle and associated with many of the 'Soho' artists. Christopher Barker writing in The Guardian about this period noted: "On many occasions through the early Sixties, writers and painters such as David Gascoyne, Paddy Kavanagh, Roberts MacBryde and Colquhoun and Paddy Swift [Swift lived downstairs from Smart and his wife, Agnes, wrote cookbooks with Smart] would gather at Westbourne Terrace in Paddington, our family home at that time. They came for editorial discussions about their poetry magazine, X."

In addition to the unconventional nature of the relationship, the affair was fraught with turmoil. Barker was a heavy drinker and Smart took up the habit, which intensified when the two were together. The couple were involved in numerous fights; during one argument, Smart bit off part of Barker's upper lip. Nonetheless, as evidenced from writings in her journals, Smart's love for Barker continued for the remainder of her life.

== Single mother and writer ==
Raising four children on her own, Smart worked for 13 years as an advertising copywriter, becoming the highest-paid copywriter in England. She joined the staff of Queen magazine in 1963, later becoming an editor. During this time her physical involvement with Barker waned and she took several other lovers, male and female.

Meanwhile, By Grand Central Station I Sat Down and Wept had been circulating in London and New York, acquiring a cult following that led to its paperback reissue in 1966 and critical acclaim. In the same year, Smart retired from commercial writing and relocated to a cottage in north Suffolk named "The Dell".

It was at The Dell that Smart produced the bulk of her subsequent literary work, much of which has been published posthumously. Eager to make up for the time away from creative writing forced by the demands of raising her children, Smart wrote voluminously and on a number of subjects, poetry and prose, even her passion for gardening.

In 1977, following a 32-year absence from the book world, Smart published two new works, The Assumption of the Rogues & Rascals and a small collection of poetry, titled A Bonus. Later, In the Meantime (1984), a collection of Smart's unpublished poetry and prose appeared, and her two volumes of journals, Necessary Secrets: The Journals of Elizabeth Smart (1986) were published posthumously.

Smart returned to Canada for a brief stay from 1982 to 1983, becoming writer-in-residence at the University of Alberta. Afterward she spent a year in Toronto on a Canada Council writer's grant before returning to England. In 1986 she died in London of a heart attack. She is buried in St George's churchyard, St Cross South Elmham, Suffolk.

An hour-long documentary, Elizabeth Smart: On the Side of the Angels (1991) by Maya Gallus starred actor Jackie Burroughs as Elizabeth Smart and was narrated by author Michael Ondaatje. The publication of her journals in On The Side of the Angels brought further posthumous critical appreciation

== Influence ==
Morrissey, former lead singer of the British band the Smiths, has talked of his love for Elizabeth Smart. References to By Grand Station Central I Sat Down And Wept are found in a number of Smiths songs, in particular "What She Said", "Reel Around The Fountain" and "Well, I Wonder", and as well, the title of the Smiths compilation album Louder Than Bombs.

Ian Brown used a passage from Elizabeth's poem A Musical Note to name his third solo album The Music of the Spheres.

Canadian playwright Wendy Lill wrote a play entitled Memories of You (1989) about the life of Elizabeth Smart.

== Works ==
- Smart, Elizabeth. By Grand Central Station I Sat Down and Wept. New York: Vintage Press, 1992, First edition 1945. ISBN 978-0-6797-3804-6.
- Smart, Elizabeth and Agnes Ryan. Cooking the French Way (%00 Recipes). London: Littlehampton Book Services Ltd., 1966, first edition 1958. ISBN 978-0-6000-3433-9.
- Smart, Elizabeth. A Bonus. London: Jay Landesman Publishing, 1977. ISBN 978-0-9051-5001-7.
- Smart, Elizabeth. The Assumption of the Rogues and Rascals. New York: HarperCollins, 1978. ISBN 978-0-586-09040-4.
- Smart, Elizabeth. Ten Poems. Bath, UK: Bath Place Community Arts Press, 1981.
- Smart, Elizabeth. Eleven Poems. Bath, UK: Bath Place Community Arts Press, 1982.
- Smart, Elizabeth. In the Meantime. Ottawa: Deneau, 1984. ISBN 978-0-8887-9105-4.
- Smart, Elizabeth. Elizabeth's Garden: Elizabeth Smart on the Art of Gardening. Toronto: Coach House Press, 1989. ISBN 978-0-8891-0356-6.
- Smart, Elizabeth.The Collected Poems of Elizabeth Smart. London: Paladin, 1992. ISBN 978-0-5860-8955-2.

=== Edited collections ===
- Smart, Elizabeth, Christina Burridge ed. Autobiographies. Vancouver: William Hoffer, 1987.
- Smart, Elizabeth, Alice Van Wart, ed. Juvenilia: Early Writings of Elizabeth Smart. Toronto: Coach House Press, 1987. ISBN 978-0-8891-0354-2.
- Smart, Elizabeth, Alice Van Wart, ed. Necessary Secrets: The Journals of Elizabeth Smart. Toronto: Harper/Collins Canada, 1987. ISBN 978-0-5860-8740-4.
- Smart, Elizabeth, Alice Van Wart, ed. On the Side of the Angels: The Second Volume of the Journals of Elizabeth Smart. Toronto: Harper/Collins Canada, 1997. ISBN 978-0-5860-8958-3.
