= Oliver Mowat Biggar =

Canadian lawyer and civil servant

Colonel (retired) Oliver Mowat Biggar CMG KC
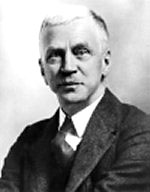

2nd Judge Advocate General of Canada
- In office 1918–1920
- Preceded by: Henry Smith
- Succeeded by: John Orde

1st Chief Electoral Officer of Canada
- In office 1920–1927
- Preceded by: position established
- Succeeded by: Jules Castonguay

Personal details
- Born: October 11, 1876 Toronto, Ontario, Canada
- Died: September 4, 1948 (aged 71) Ottawa, Ontario, Canada
- Spouse(s): Muriel Elizabeth Whitney (m. April 30, 1908 in Toronto, Ontario)
- Relations: Charles Robert Webster Biggar (father), Jane Helen Mowat (mother), James Lyons Biggar and Sir Oliver Mowat (grandfathers)
- Education: University of Toronto
- Profession: Lawyer, civil servant

Oliver Mowat Biggar, CMG, KC (October 11, 1876 – September 4, 1948) was a Canadian lawyer and civil servant. He was the second judge advocate general for the Canadian Militia and the first chief electoral officer of Canada. He also served as the first Canadian co-chair of the Canada–United States Permanent Joint Board on Defense. Biggar was well known as a leading Canadian lawyer with expertise in public law and patent law.

== Early life and education ==
Biggar was born in Toronto, Ontario. He was the eldest son of lawyer Charles Robert Webster Biggar and Jane Helen Mowat (daughter of Sir Oliver Mowat, a former premier of Ontario).

Biggar was educated at Upper Canada College, graduating in 1894. He attended University College at the University of Toronto and graduated with a B.A. in 1898. In 1901 Biggar graduated from Osgoode Hall Law School and began practising as a lawyer with Biggar & Burton. By 1903, he moved to Edmonton, Alberta, and was called to the bar there.

On April 30, 1908, he married Muriel Elizabeth Whitney (daughter of J.G. Whitney). Together they had one daughter, Sally Vernon Biggar.

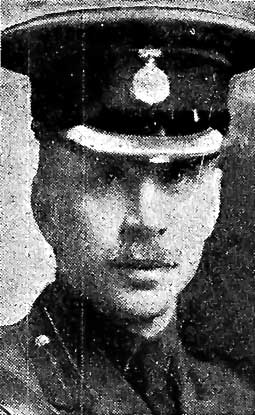
O.M. Biggar, c. 1917-1918

== Early career and military involvement ==
While in Edmonton, Biggar made a reputation for himself as a capable lawyer. He practised with Short, Cross and Biggar from 1903 to 1915, and was made King's Counsel in 1913. He was appointed in 1911 to the Board of Governors of the University of Alberta, on which he served until 1914. He also served on the Board of Edmonton Hospital during this period. From 1915 to 1920, he was counsel for Woods, Sherry, Collison & Field in Edmonton.

When World War I broke out, Biggar enlisted with the 101st Regiment "Edmonton Fusiliers". From 1916 to 1917, he served as the assistant judge advocate general for Military District 13 in Calgary, following which he served on the Military Service Council. He soon rose to the rank of lieutenant-colonel, and was appointed Judge Advocate General of Canada in 1918. The following year, he was promoted to the rank of colonel.

== Delegate to Paris 1919 peace conference ==
At the conclusion of World War I, Sir Robert Borden, Canada's prime minister, invited Biggar to attend the Paris Peace Conference as chief legal adviser and member of the Canadian delegation. Biggar was also asked to serve as British Secretary of the War Guilt Commission and Assistant Secretary of the British delegation.

== Civil service roles ==
Upon his return to Canada, Biggar continued to serve in various senior civil service roles. He was named vice chairman of the Air Board serving under Arthur Sifton, where he organized Canada's Air Department to govern the fledgling aeronautics industry. This was subsequently divided into its civilian (Canadian Air Transport Board) and military (Royal Canadian Air Force) components. Biggar served on the Air Board from 1919 to 1922. Biggar was also retained as counsel to the Department of Justice to represent the Canadian government on a number of cases, including a case before the Supreme Court of Canada regarding the jurisdiction of the Board of Commerce under the War Measures Act.

=== Chief electoral officer ===
In 1920, the House of Commons of Canada unanimously voted for Biggar as Canada's first chief electoral officer following the enactment of the Dominion Elections Act. During his tenure, he increased the accuracy and completeness of the voter rolls, in particular by adding women, who had been allowed to vote in federal elections for the first time in 1921 but had often been prevented from voting by inaccurate voter rolls. Biggar recommended to Parliament that advance polling be made more widely available, a suggestion that Parliament took up.

=== League of Nations ===
Biggar was a staunch supporter of the League of Nations and advocated for Canada's role in it. As a former advisor to Prime Minister Borden and a delegate to the 1919 Paris peace conference where the League was founded, Biggar often consulted government officials and politicians on matters of international law. He served as chairman of the Canadian Bar Association committee on international law, and was the chairman of the Canadian League of Nations Society executive committee. In 1924, Biggar was asked by Prime Minister William Lyon Mackenzie King to advise the Department of External Affairs on Canada's role in the League of Nations. This role was later taken over by Oscar D. Skelton.

=== National Resources Acts ===
From 1925 to 1926, Biggar was involved as a negotiator in the drafting of the Natural Resources Acts, which transferred control over crown lands and natural resources from the federal government to the provincial governments. He was appointed by the Department of the Interior to represent the federal government's position in negotiations with Alberta. Biggar played a role in limiting provincial jurisdiction over aboriginal communities, arguing in favour of protection of aboriginal rights including hunting and fishing rights on crown lands within provincial territory.

== Return to private practice with Smart & Biggar ==
In 1927, Biggar was invited by Russel S. Smart, the Ottawa managing partner of the intellectual property law firm then known as Fetherstonhaugh & Smart, to join his growing litigation practice as a partner. Biggar accepted the offer and resigned from his post as Chief Electoral Officer. Together, the two men formed the firm Smart & Biggar. The same year, he published a treatise comparing Canadian, British, and American patent law.

During his time in private practice, Biggar appeared on behalf of a large variety of companies in numerous intellectual property cases. He continued practice in public and constitutional law, including acting as counsel for the Province of Alberta in Reference Re Alberta Statutes, a landmark Supreme Court of Canada decision on the jurisdiction of Alberta to enact the Social Credit Act and the Bank Taxation Act. Biggar was retained as counsel in 1938 and 1939 on behalf of the Senate Committee on Railways, which was tasked with the problem of the financial burden the railway system was placing on the government.

== Second World War ==
Col. O.M. Biggar with Mayor Fiorello La Guardia

The outbreak of World War II and Canada's participation led Biggar to return to civil service. In 1940, then Canadian Prime Minister Mackenzie King selected Biggar to be one of his senior advisors and appointed him to the newly created Canada-U.S. Permanent Joint Board on Defense. This Board was co-chaired by Biggar as representative of Canada and Fiorello La Guardia, the former mayor of New York as the U.S. representative.

In 1942, Biggar was appointed Director of Censorship working under Minister of War Services Joseph Thorarinn Thorson. He was tasked with creating a single agency for the purpose of effective wartime censorship out of what was then five separate operations. These operations became one branch of the National War Services Department that was staffed successfully by volunteers. Biggar was invited to be a member of the Wartime Information Board.

== Later life and death ==
Biggar suffered a heart failure in the spring of 1944 and was forced to reduce his responsibilities. With his health deteriorating, he relinquished his duties to General Andrew McNaughton in 1945.

Biggar died in Ottawa in 1948, at the age of 71.

Government offices
| Preceded by new position | Chief Electoral Officer; 1920–1927 | Succeeded by Jules Castonguay |
