= Michael Manson (judge) =

Canadian judge

Michael D. Manson is a justice with the Federal Court of Canada, appointed October 5, 2012. Prior to his appointment he was a lawyer with the law firm Smart & Biggar in Vancouver, British Columbia.
