= Hatfield Hall (Cobourg) =

Coordinates: 43.9609°N 78.1599°W

Hatfield Hall was a private school for girls in Cobourg, Ontario, Canada. It opened in 1929 and closed in 1951.

The school located at 202 Green Street, south of King Street, and associated with nearby St. Peter's Anglican Church. The church's rector, Dr. Temple Boyle, also served as school president.

Canadian poet Elizabeth Smart attended the school.

After the school closed in 1951 the buildings continued to be used. From 1957 until 1972, the main school building was used by the local radio station CHUC-FM. The rooms in the building are currently rented as apartments.
