= Cecily Strickland =

Canadian lawyer and judge

Cecily Y. Strickland
- Born: 1959 (age 65–66)
- Citizenship: Canada
- Occupation(s): lawyer, judge
- Organization: Federal Court of Canada

Cecily Y. Strickland (born 1959) is a justice with the Federal Court of Canada. Before her appointment she was a lawyer at the firm Stewart McKelvey in St. John's, Newfoundland and Labrador. She is a graduate of the Marine Institute of Memorial University of Newfoundland (Diploma in Naval Architecture Technology) and Dalhousie Law School (Bachelor and Master's of Law), now known as Schulich School of Law.

She has ruled in several notable cases.
