= F. B. Fetherstonhaugh =

Canadian lawyer

F. B. Fetherstonhaugh KC
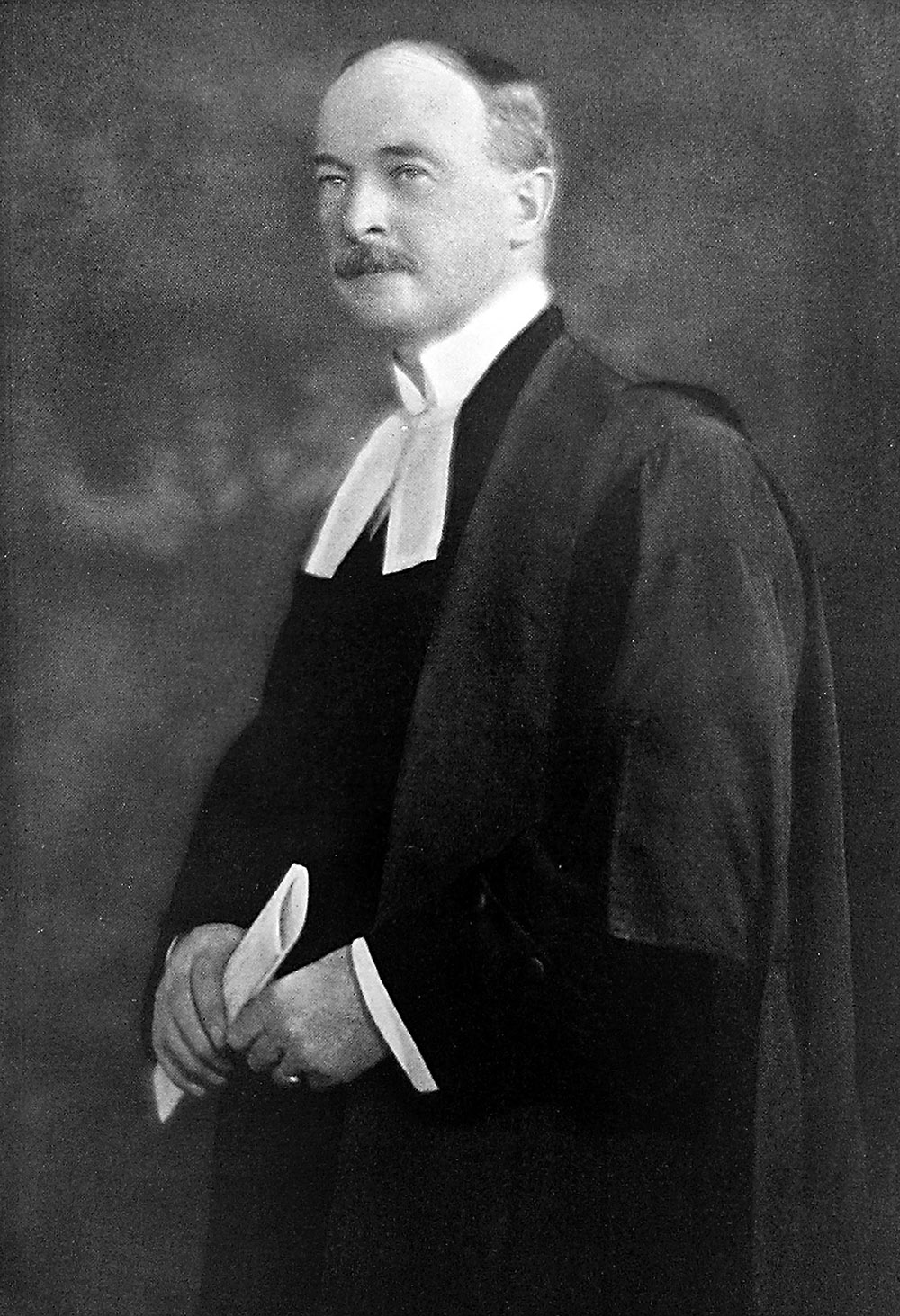
- Fetherstonhaugh c. 1923
- Born: Frederick Barnard Fetherstonhaugh; June 2, 1863; Paisley, Canada West
- Died: July 6, 1945 (aged 82); Mimico, Ontario, Canada
- Occupations: Lawyer, patent agent
- Spouse: Marion Arabella Rutledge
- Children: 4

Frederick Barnard Fetherstonhaugh KC (June 2, 1863 – July 6, 1945) was a Canadian patent lawyer and agent who founded the patent agency Fetherstonhaugh & Co. He was widely recognized for his expertise in patent law. Fetherstonhaugh was also the owner of one of the first electric cars in Canada.

== Biography ==
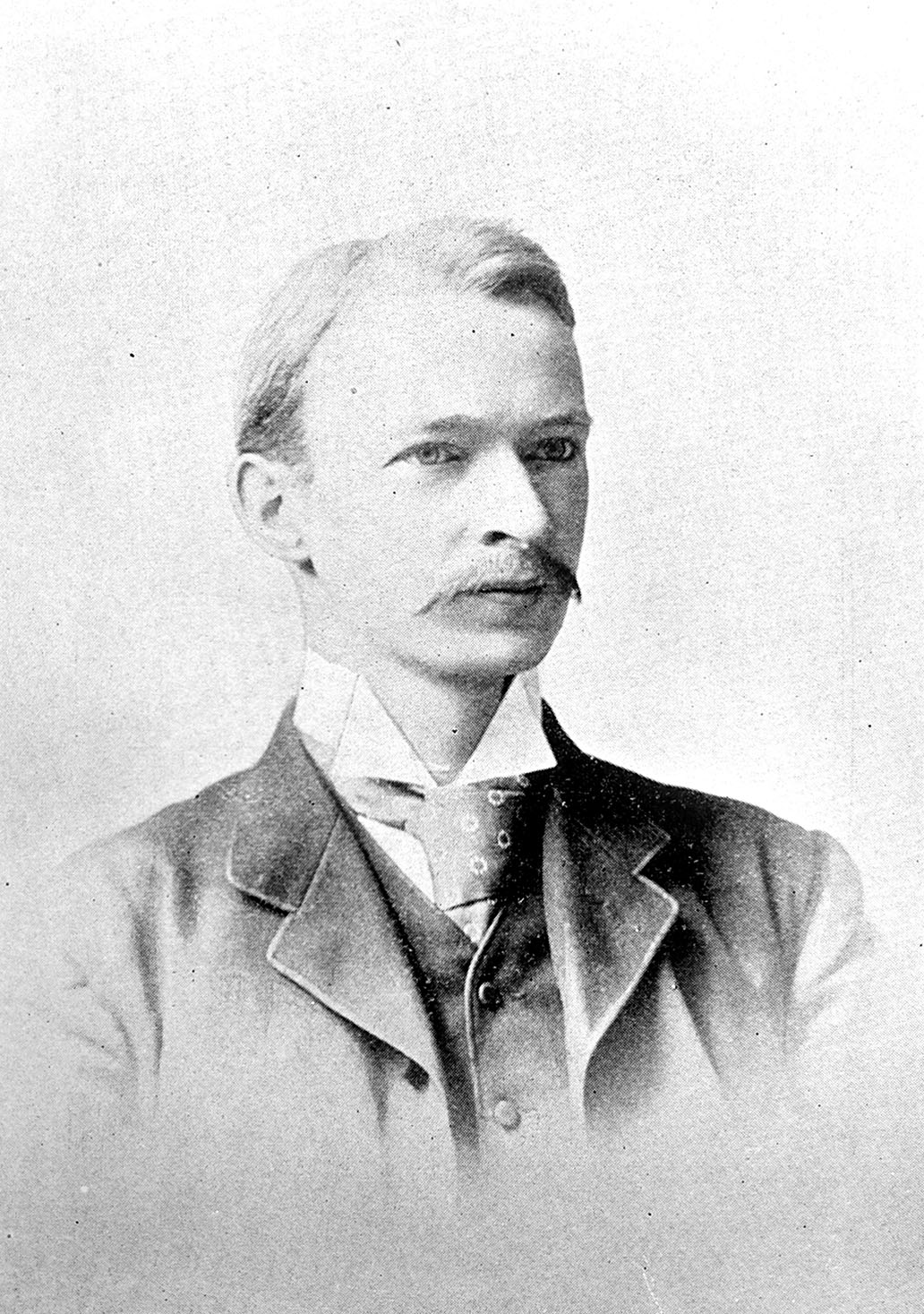
Portrait of Fetherstonhaugh, c. 1891

=== Family and education ===
Frederick Bernard Fetherstonhaugh was born in Paisley, Ontario on June 2, 1863, to Francis Fetherstonhaugh and Frances Swift. He was a descendant of the Irish Fetherstonhaughs of Carrick House in County Westmeath. His father immigrated to Canada around 1859 and resided in various towns in Ontario including Orillia, Guelph, and Paisley, until he settled in Toronto with his family.

Fetherstonhaugh attended the Ryerson School in his youth, where he excelled academically, eventually winning a scholarship to the Toronto Collegiate Institute for two years. He then attended the University of Toronto, taking courses at the School of Practical Science in Mechanical Engineering. Before finishing his diploma, however, he decided to pursue the study of law.

He married Marion Arabella Rutledge in February 1887 and had four children, though only the eldest—James Edward Marion (b. 1888)—survived into adulthood. Godfrey Orme (b. 1889) died of a cerebral hemorrhage after his nurse lost control of his baby carriage; Marion Vivian (b. 1890) died of "infantile convulsions" in 1892; and Frederic Harold (b. 1892) died on the eve of his fifth birthday when he was struck by a streetcar while crossing Spadina Ave in front of the family home near Harbord St. His eldest son, James Edward Marion, would later attain the rank of major in the Canadian Army after serving in World War I and joined his father's patent business after the war as an engineering expert.

=== Law career ===
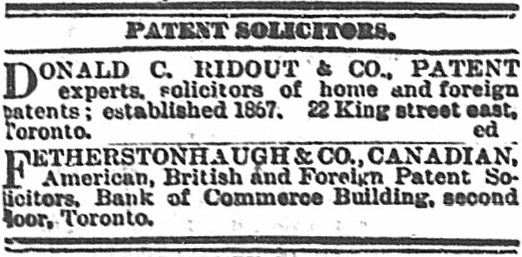
Advertisement for Patent Solicitors in The Globe, May 2, 1890

Fetherstonhaugh began his career with the patent law firm Donald C. Ridout & Co, where he was a draftsman along with Charles Riches and James E. Maybee before his call to the bar in 1889. One year after his bar admission, in 1890, he formed his own firm, Fetherstonhaugh & Co., where he took up practice as a patent lawyer.

The firm Fetherstonhaugh & Co. opened its first location on the second floor of the Bank of Commerce Building at 19-25 King Street W, and was the first tenant of the building. His patent law practice expanded quickly. In 1895, an Ottawa office was opened at 7 Elgin Street, managed by T.S. Young. In 1896, he opened a Montreal office with his brother, Edward James Fetherstonhaugh. By 1905, offices had been opened in New York City (managed by Albert T. Nathan, a former patent examiner) and in Washington, D.C.

In 1904, Russel S. Smart joined his firm as the manager of the Ottawa office. Smart later took over the legal practice of the firm while Fetherstonhaugh continued his patent agency, forming a partnership that has continued to this day as Smart & Biggar/Fetherstonhaugh. By the time of Fetherstonhaugh's death in 1945, several more offices had been established across Canada, including in Hamilton, Vancouver, Winnipeg, Halifax, and Saint John.

During his career, Fetherstonhaugh was recognized as a leading expert in his field and was regularly consulted by Parliament regarding legislative amendments to patent laws and regulations. Around 1905, he advocated for uniformity of patent legislation within the British Empire, arguing that it would enhance scientific progress and reduce costs for inventors obtaining patents in multiple jurisdictions. In support of this proposal, Fetherstonhaugh drafted the Empire Patent Act, which was designed to coordinate the policies of patent offices across the British Empire. However, his proposed unification of patent laws in the British Empire never came to pass. Fetherstonhaugh was made a King's Counsel in 1910.

=== Fetherstonhaugh car ===
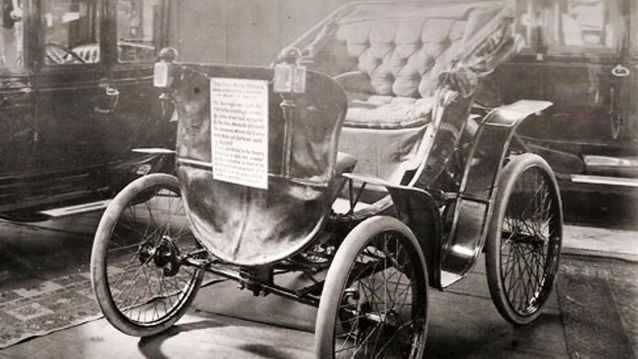
Photo of the Fetherstonhaugh car, one of the first electric cars in Canada, shown at the Toronto Exhibition c. 1896

Fetherstonhaugh was an enthusiast of new technologies and was most notably an early adopter of the electric automobile. In 1893, (Note: There is some debate about this date. Secondary sources place the date at 1893, but the first public record of such a car appeared in an article in The Globe dated 1896, which described the car as if it were the first of its kind. See Wencer (2012).) Fetherstonhaugh unveiled a battery-powered "horseless carriage" at the John Dixon works factory on Bay Street in Toronto. This was one of the first such carriages to appear in Canada.

An article in The Globe covering the debut of the Fetherstonhaugh vehicle described it as a carriage having four horse power, with a top speed of 15 miles per hour (24 km/h) and a battery that lasted for five hours of continuous driving. It weighed 700 pounds, including a 100-pound motor and 270 pounds of batteries. It had a covered top and windows to protect against the elements, and had electric headlights for night time driving. An iron bar was used to steer as well as control the power.

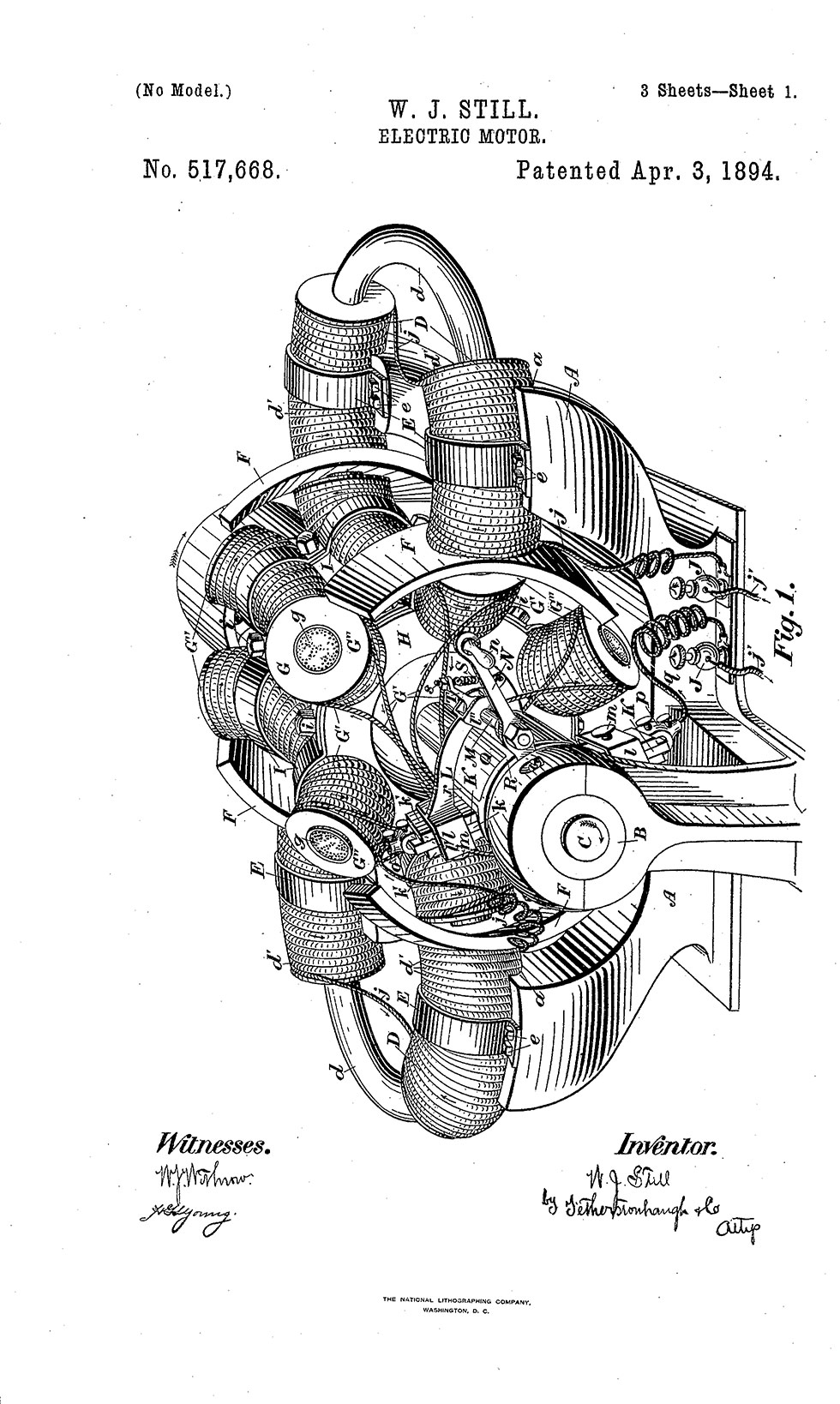
U.S. Patent No. 517,668 to W. J. Still, drafted by Fetherstonhaugh

The electrical and mechanical components of the vehicle were the result of 18 months' work by inventor William Joseph Still (who later developed the Still engine), for whom Fetherstonhaugh had obtained several automobile-related patents in Canada. Fetherstonhaugh himself evidently assisted in the overall design of the vehicle and the vehicle was assembled by John Dixon, a reputable carriage maker of the era. The car was allegedly worth $500 at the time, but Fetherstonhaugh decided to keep it for himself as a personal vehicle with which he commuted to work and around the city.

To recharge the car, Fetherstonhaugh connected it to the trolley wires running near his home. He later purchased his own gasoline generator to recharge the batteries. Fetherstonhaugh kept the car until around 1912, when it was sold. Its whereabouts after 1912 are not known.

The Fetherstonhaugh car appeared at the 1893 Toronto Industrial Exhibition (predecessor to the Canadian National Exhibition), where it was driven around a track for demonstration. It appeared again in 1898 along with other new automobiles. In 1993, a commemorative $100 gold coin designed by John Mardon was issued by the Royal Canadian Mint to celebrate the 100th anniversary of the Fetherstonhaugh car.

The success of this early electric automobile inspired a group of Toronto businessmen to form the Canadian Motor Syndicate, with William Still as an engineer and later its vice-president. The syndicate produced several more cars, but it survived only until 1899. Still went on to form the Still Motor Company, building electric and later gasoline-powered engines for vehicles.

Fetherstonhaugh was an avid supporter of transportation infrastructure. He was an early advocate for a bridge between Toronto and the Toronto Islands at the Western Gap near the site of what is now the Toronto island airport.

Fetherstonhaugh's interest in transportation technology also extended beyond electric cars. In 1909, it was reported that an experimental airship was being tested from his Mimico property in collaboration with one of his clients. Fetherstonhaugh also believed that airports would one day become obsolete as aircraft would be able to take off and land from flat rooftops of buildings.

=== Lynne Lodge: Fetherstonhaugh's Mimico estate ===
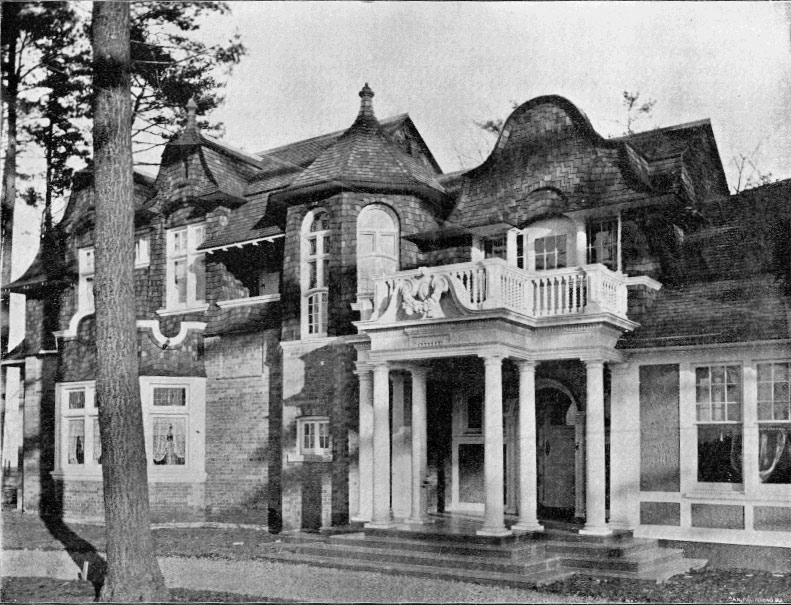
Lynne Lodge, residence of Frederick B Fetherstonhaugh in Mimico, Ontario (1895). Detail of entrance. Designed by Henry Sproatt.

Buoyed by the success of his patent business, Fetherstonhaugh commissioned a lavish residence for himself in 1899 on a large plot of lake shore property in Mimico (near the intersection of Lake Shore Boulevard and Royal York Road today) just outside the Toronto city limits at the time. He was one of the first to move into what would eventually become a residential suburb while commuting regularly to Downtown Toronto for work.

The primary residence he built was named "Lynne Lodge", after his mother's family home in Ireland. It had a view of Lake Ontario but was close to the streetcar line running along Lake Shore Blvd at the time. Lynne Lodge was designed by Henry Sproatt, a prominent 20th century Canadian architect. It was built in a Queen Anne revival style, and it is believed that the building was designed during Sproatt's "independent period", completed before he began a partnership with Ernest Rolph in 1901.

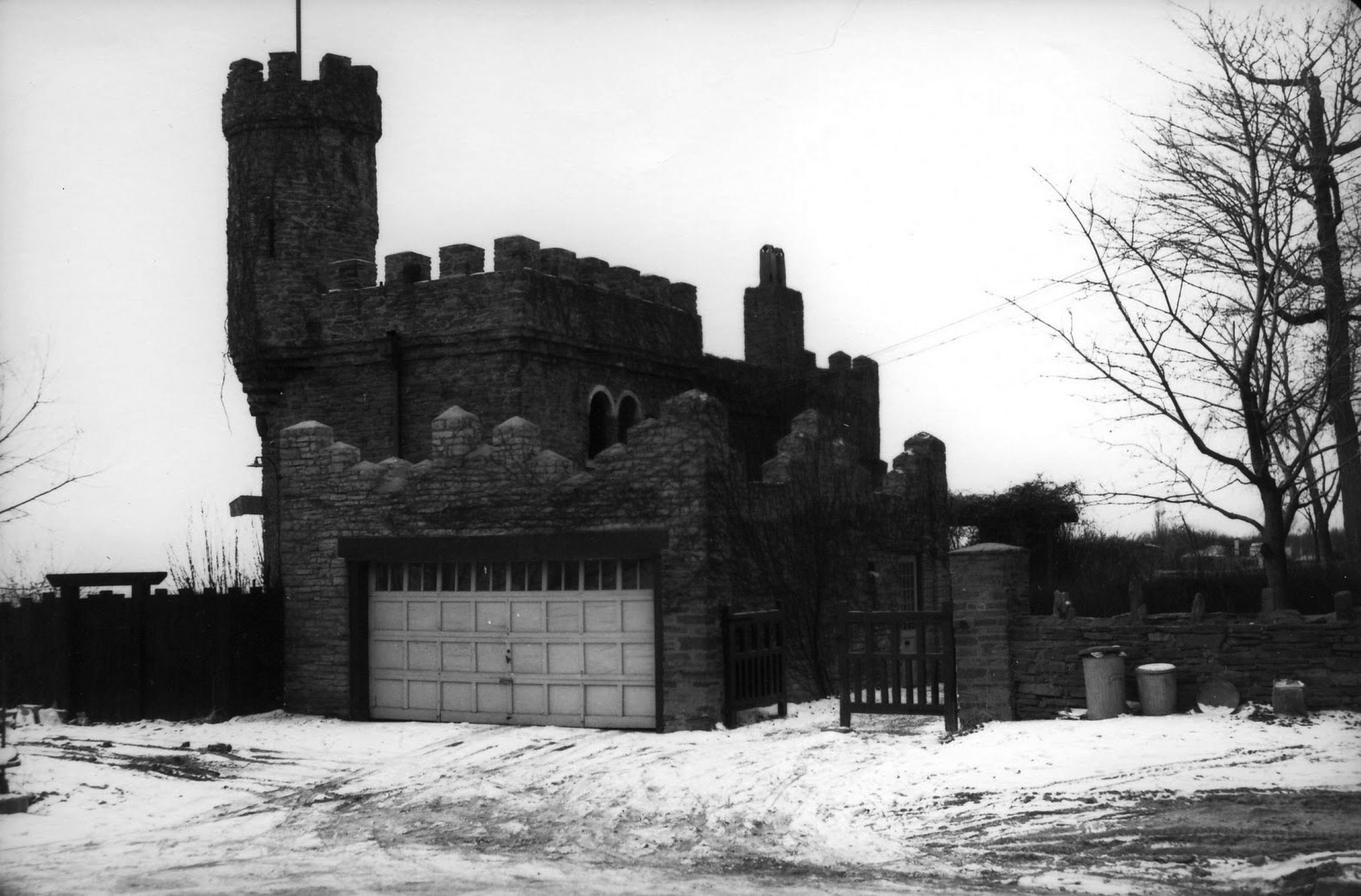
Guest House of Lynne Lodge, nicknamed "The Towers", at the residence of Frederick B Fetherstonhaugh, viewed from Church St.

Additions were made over the years to the residence, including a stable (later converted to a gardener's cottage) and a boat house. Around 1910, a stone guest house was built on a point of land on the Mimico property known as "Thunder Head", which jutted out into Lake Ontario at the foot of Royal York Road. The guest house was named "The Towers" for its architectural features resembling a castle. The Towers were used by his wife for painting, and later for their son James after his return from World War I. In the 1930s, the musician Horace Lapp lived in The Towers as a tenant for a period of time before moving into the boat house, to which he added a second floor with Fetherstonhaugh's permission.

After Fetherstonhaugh's death in 1945, Lynne Lodge was sold to a series of developers, serving a short stint as the Lynne Arms Italian Village restaurant before it was demolished in 1957 to make room for an apartment building. The Towers and the boat house were also later demolished, though parts of the walls can still be seen. The gardener's cottage (at 2669-2673 Lake Shore Blvd W) remains the only surviving part of the Fetherstonhaugh estate, and was designated as a Heritage Property by the City of Toronto in 2011.

=== Memberships and associations ===
Fetherstonhaugh was a founding member of the British Empire Club, and served as its president in 1910. He was presented at Windsor Castle in June 1905 to King Edward VII and attended the coronation of King George V in 1911.

=== Later life and death ===
Fetherstonhaugh's wife Marion died on November 7, 1930, at the age of 63. Two years later, Fetherstonhaugh married Audrey Victoria Emaygh, a singer from New York who was 32 years his junior. However, his second marriage was an unhappy one, and they divorced shortly thereafter. In his later years, his finances deteriorated and his business was eventually taken over by Russel S. Smart. He also became estranged from his son James due to a dispute over James' divorce and second marriage. Fetherstonhaugh died on July 6, 1945, in Mimico, at the age of 82. Upon his death, his estate was valued at only $13,000.

His sister Frances was the paternal grandmother of actor Christopher Plummer.
