= Catherine Kane =

Canadian judge

Catherine Kane is a justice with the Federal Court of Canada. She graduated with a BA from Saint Patrick's College and an LLB from the University of Ottawa. In 1999 she became the first director of the Policy Centre for Victim Issues in the Department of Justice, a position she served in until 2007.
