= By Grand Central Station I Sat Down and Wept =

Prose poetry novel by Elizabeth Smart

- Author: Elizabeth Smart
- Language: English
- Publisher: Editions Poetry
- Publication date: 1945
- Publication place: Canada
- Media type: Print
- ISBN: 978-0-586-09039-8
- OCLC: 26314482

By Grand Central Station I Sat Down and Wept is a 1945 novel in prose poetry by the Canadian author Elizabeth Smart (1913–1986). The work was inspired by Smart's passionate affair with the British poet George Barker (1913–1991).

== Genesis and writing ==
Smart discovered Barker's poetry—specifically his poem Daedalus—in the late 1930s in Better Books on Charing Cross Road, London. Their affair lasted 18 years; Smart bore four of the 15 children Barker had by four different women. In the novel, her multiple pregnancies are reduced to one and other details of the affair are omitted. The narrator's lover is barely described, as Smart focuses on her own experience and feelings, which was rare for the male-centric literature of that day. Barker documented the affair in his own novel The Dead Seagull (1950). The novel takes its title from New York's Grand Central Terminal, where, pregnant and abandoned by her lover, the narrator sits down and weeps.

In 1941, the pregnant Smart returned to Canada, settling in Pender Harbour, British Columbia, to have their first child, Georgina, while continuing to write the book. Barker tried to visit her, but Smart's family ensured that he was turned back at the border for "moral turpitude." She moved to Washington, D.C., to support herself, her daughter, and her writing by working as a file clerk for the British embassy. In 1943, in the midst of the Battle of the Atlantic, she sailed to England to join Barker, where she gave birth to their second child, Christopher. She completed the novel while working for the Ministry of Defence, which fired her after its publication.

== Style and reception ==
The title, as a foretaste of Smart's poetic techniques, uses metre (it is largely anapaestic), contains words denoting exalted or intensified states (grandeur, centrality, weeping), and alludes to Psalm 137 ("By the waters of Babylon we lay down and wept ...") which indicates metaphorical significance for the novel's subject matter.

In an essay for Open Letters Monthly, Ingrid Norton stated "the power of emotion to transform one’s perspective on the world is the theme of this wildly poetic novel", calling it "a howl of a book, shot through with vivid imagery and ecstatic language, alternately exasperating and invigorating".

Just 2000 copies of By Grand Central Station I Sat Down and Wept were printed on its initial publication by Editions Poetry London in 1945, and it did not achieve popularity at its initial release. Smart's mother, Louise, led a successful campaign with government officials to have its publication banned in Canada. She bought up as many copies as she could find of those that made their way into the country and had them burned. Barker himself, in a letter to Smart, described the novel as "a Catherine wheel of a book."

The book was reissued in 1966 by Panther Books, with an introduction by the critic Brigid Brophy. At that time the novelist Angela Carter praised the novel in a Guardian review as “like Madame Bovary blasted by lightning” but later wrote privately to her friend, the critic Lorna Sage, that it inspired her to found the feminist publisher Virago Press, from "the desire that no daughter of mine should ever be in a position to be able to write BY GRAND CENTRAL STATION I SAT DOWN AND WEPT, exquisite prose though it might contain. (BY GRAND CENTRAL STATION I TORE OFF HIS BALLS would be more like it, I should hope.)" Brigid Brophy described the novel as "one of the half-dozen masterpieces of poetic prose in the world".

== Legacy ==
The novel remains in print. It is widely regarded as a classic of women's Modernist literature.

Laura Lamson authored a screenplay, but it remains unproduced.

Excerpts from the novel, and other of the author's writings, feature in Elizabeth Smart: On The Side of the Angels (1991), an hour-long documentary of the writer, written and directed by Maya Gallus.

== References in other media ==
The novel has been referenced many times by the British singer Morrissey.

The title was adapted by the band Kitchens of Distinction in the song "On Tooting Broadway Station".

The title was adapted by Ashley Hutchings for his album By Gloucester Docks I Sat Down and Wept, which includes the track "Love, Stuff and Nonsense", credited as Smart's work.

Chamber pop duo, Heavy Bell (made up of Matt Peters and Tom Keenan) released an album titled By Grand Central Station (2018), which they called "a paean to the novel: a song of praise and triumph".

The album 'Humber Dogger Forties' by John Mouse contains a track called 'By Cardiff Central Station I Sat Down and Wept'.

Inspired "By the River Piedra I Sat Down and Wept" Book by Paulo Coelho, published in 1994.

British musician Tracey Thorn referenced the novel in the title of her song "By Picadilly Circus I Sat Down and Wept" on her 2007 album Out of the Woods.

== See also ==
- Nouveau réalisme
- New Apocalyptics
