= Glennys L. McVeigh =

Justice with the Federal Court of Canada

Glennys L. McVeigh is a justice with the Federal Court of Canada. Prior to her appointment on April 26, 2013, she served as a senior counsel with the Public Prosecution Service of Canada in Saskatoon.
