= McInnes Cooper =

Canadian law firm

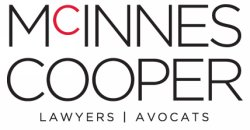
- Type: Limited liability partnership
- Industry: Law
- Founded: 1859
- Headquarters: Halifax, Nova Scotia, Canada
- Services: Legal advice
- Website: mcinnescooper.com

McInnes Cooper is regional business-oriented law firm with a presence across Atlantic Canada and a satellite office in Toronto, Ontario. It consists of over 240 lawyers and 250 related legal professionals. McInnes Cooper is headquartered in Halifax, Nova Scotia and offers clients a full range of legal services across eight offices in Charlottetown, Fredericton, Moncton, Saint John, St. John's, and Sydney. The firm thus provides services across the four Atlantic Canadian provinces, while connecting to the broader Canadian national legal market centred in Toronto.

As a multi-service firm, McInnes Cooper provides legal advice to a broad range of clients, including corporations, government agencies, regulatory institutions, and non-profit bodies. The firm's international capabilities are extended by its charter membership in Lex Mundi, the world's largest non-exclusive referral network of independent law firms with member firms in 160 jurisdictions.

McInnes Cooper is the second largest of the 'big three' Atlantic Canadian firms headquartered in Halifax, after Stewart McKelvey and before Cox & Palmer.

Furthermore, McInnes Cooper is the largest law firm in the province of Newfoundland and Labrador.

== History and Notable Clients ==
McInnes Cooper was founded in 1859 by Jonathan McCully, Hector McInnes, Gordon Cooper, and Donald MacInnes.

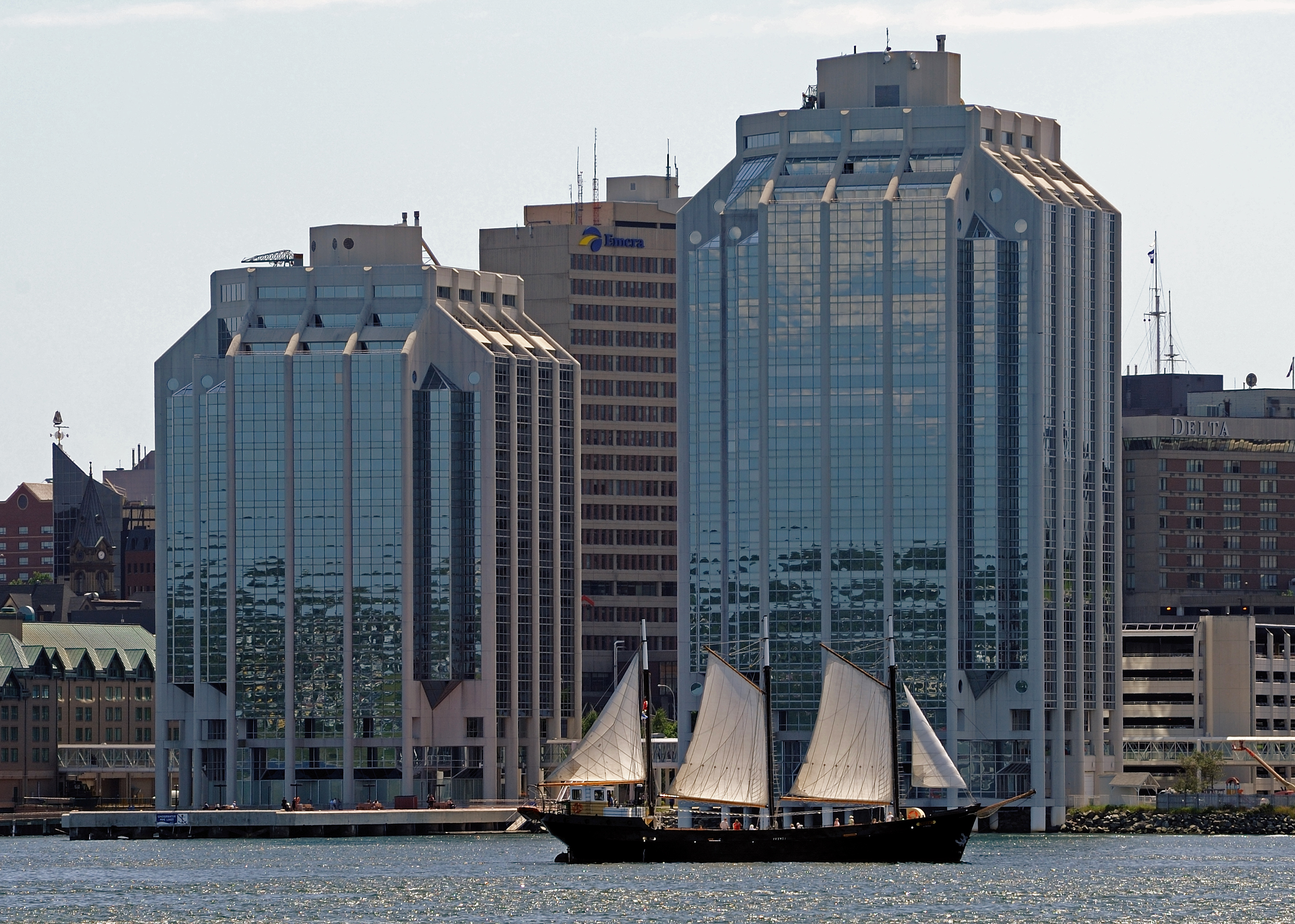
McInnes Cooper is headquartered within its namesake tower at Purdy's Wharf on the Halifax waterfront

Following the Sinking of the Titanic in 1912, McInnes Cooper notably acted as Canadian counsel representing the White Star Line. In the same decade, following the Halifax Explosion of 1917, McInnes Cooper represented the owners of the French munitions ship SS Mont-Blanc whose cargo of munitions ignited and caused the subsequent disaster.

During the 1986 Royal Commission into the Donald Marshall Jr. conviction, McInnes Cooper represented the Province of Nova Scotia.

In 1992, the firm worked on the privatization of Nova Scotia Power, which at the time was the largest private equity transaction in Canadian history.

In 2013 the firm began a formal working relationship with the Canadian Civil Liberties Association to advance civil liberties in Atlantic Canada.

In 2014, law firm Ottenheimer Baker joined McInnes Cooper in St. John's, making the combined law firm the largest in Newfoundland and Labrador.

== Notable lawyers and alumni ==
- Fred Dickson, QC – Former Senator for Halifax (2009–2012).
- Danny Graham, Special Advisor – MLA for Halifax Citadel, former leader of the Liberal Party of Nova Scotia.
- Donald MacInnes, Co-founder – Former Senator for Burlington (1881–1900), Former President of the Bank of Hamilton.
- Jonathan McCully, Co-founder – Considered a Founding Father of Canada, Former Puisne Justice of the Nova Scotia Supreme Court from 1870 to 1877.
- Hector McInnes, Co-founder – Former Advisor to Prime Ministers Sir Robert Laird Borden and Arthur Meighen, MLA for Halifax County (1916–1920).
- Stewart McInnes, PC, QC – Former Member of Parliament of the House of Commons of Canada (1984–1998).
- Frank McKenna, PC, ON, ONB, QC – Deputy Chairman of the Toronto-Dominion Bank, 27th Premier of New Brunswick, Former Canadian Ambassador to the United States.
- Jim Thistle – Former Vice President of the Liberal Party of Newfoundland and Labrador.
- Nick Whalen – Member of Parliament of the House of Commons of Canada (2015–2019).
