= Stewart McKelvey =

Canadian law firm

- No. of offices: 6
- Offices: Halifax, Saint John, Fredericton, Moncton, Charlottetown, St. John's
- No. of lawyers: 257
- No. of employees: 592
- Revenue: 230.1 million CAD
- Date founded: May 1, 1990
- Website: stewartmckelvey.com

Stewart McKelvey is a major regional Canadian law firm based in Atlantic Canada. It is the largest law firm in Atlantic Canada and one of the 20 largest in Canada. Founded in 1990 as Stewart McKelvey Stirling Scales following the merging of multiple Atlantic-based law firms, it now holds six offices, with 592 employees and 257 lawyers. The firm's operations are principally located in Halifax, Nova Scotia, with smaller offices in Saint John, Fredericton and Moncton in New Brunswick, Charlottetown in Prince Edward Island, and St. John's in Newfoundland.. Stewart McKelvey has been recognized as one of Canada's top law firms particularly strong in corporate and commercial matters, as well as labour and employment, civil and commercial litigation, healthcare, construction and maritime law.

Stewart McKelvey is the largest of the 'big three' Atlantic Canadian law firms headquartered in Halifax, ahead of McInnes Cooper and Cox & Palmer.

== History ==
Stewart McKelvey Stirling Scales was founded on May 1, 1990, from the merging of McKelvey Macaulay Machum of Saint John, New Brunswick, Stewart MacKeen & Covert of Halifax and Sydney, Nova Scotia, Stirling Ryan of St. John's, Newfoundland, and Scales Jenkins & McQuaid of Charlottetown, Prince Edward Island. The merger resulted in the new law firm having over 125 lawyers, becoming the largest law firm in Atlantic Canada, as well as one of the 15 largest law firms in Canada. In May 2000, the firm celebrated its tenth anniversary. At the time, the firm contained 175 lawyers across seven locations. The firm was renamed from Stewart McKelvey Stirling Scales to Stewart McKelvey sometime in 2006. (Note: Up until August 2006, the firm's website went by the name "Stewart McKelvey Stirling Scales". The firm changed their website between August 12, 2006 and August 22, 2006 to "Stewart McKelvey".)

== Notable firm members and alumni ==
- Neil McKelvey – One of the founding members, owner of the former McKelvey Macaulay Machum firm
- Graham Day
- Jim Cowan
- Sean Casey
- Michel Bastarache
- Gérard La Forest
- Cecily Strickland
- Brian Gallant - 33rd premier of New Brunswick, practiced law with Stewart McKelvey
- Graham Steele
- Glen Dexter
