= Michel M. J. Shore =

Canadian Judge

Retired Judge of the Federal Court of Canada and of the Court Martial Appeal Court
- Incumbent
- Assumed office November 4, 2003

Personal details
- Born: March 21, 1948 (age 78) Paris, France

Michel M. J. Shore (born March 21, 1948) is a retired Judge of the Federal Court of Canada and of the Court Martial Appeal Court.

In 2016–2017, he wrote a weekly sonnet entitled 'Torah In Verse' on the weekly Torah portion.

In 2021, Justice Shore wrote 15 sonnets as commentary on the Psalms of Ascent, inspired by R' Shaya Treitel obm.
