= Yvan Roy (justice) =

Justice in the Federal Court of Canada

Yvan Roy is a justice with the Federal Court of Canada. Before his appointment he was a lawyer with the Government of Canada, Privy Council Office.

== Notable cases ==
He rejected an application by Catalonian leader Carles Puigdemont for a visa to visit Canada. He ruled that Bombardier Recreational Products (BRP) was entitled to a $135 Canadian dollar payment for each of nearly 21,000 Arctic Cat snowmobiles infringing on a BRP patent that were sold in Canada between 2008 and 2014.

He has also ruled in several other immigration cases.
