= Smart & Biggar =

Canadian law firm

- No. of offices: 6
- No. of attorneys: approximately 180
- No. of employees: 500
- Major practice areas: Intellectual property
- Date founded: 1890; 136 years ago (as Fetherstonhaugh & Co.)
- Founders: Frederick Fetherstonhaugh; Russel S. Smart; Oliver M. Biggar
- Website: www.smartbiggar.ca

Smart & Biggar is the common name and brand for the Canadian law firm Smart & Biggar LLP and the patent and trademark agency Smart & Biggar IP Agency Co. (formerly Fetherstonhaugh & Co).

Smart & Biggar has 180 intellectual property lawyers, patent agents, and trademark agents working in Ottawa, Toronto, Montréal, Vancouver, Waterloo, and Calgary.

== History ==
The firm was founded in Toronto by Frederick Fetherstonhaugh in 1890 as a patent firm known as Fetherstonhaugh & Co. Fetherstonhaugh was a patent attorney from Mimico who was well known for having one of the first electrified homes in Toronto as well as owning the first electric car in Ontario, which was created by William Joseph Still in 1893.

An Ottawa office was established in 1895, and was joined by Russel S. Smart in 1904. Smart joined as a patent agent at the age of 19 with only a mechanical engineering degree from the University of Toronto, and he was later called to the Bar of Quebec in 1911 and to the Bar of Ontario in 1922. He was made a partner of the firm in 1913 with the patent agency then known as Fetherstonhaugh & Co., while the law firm was rebranded as Fetherstonhaugh & Smart.

Fetherstonhaugh was joined in 1923 by Harold G. Fox to create the patent agency Fetherstonhaugh & Fox in Toronto. In 1927, Oliver M. Biggar joined the partnership at the behest of Smart to form Smart & Biggar.

== Success ==
One of the best-known successes in the firm's early years came in the case of Lightning Fastener v. Colonial Fastener, where Fox, along with Smart and Biggar, successfully represented Lightning Fastener Co. and Gideon Sundback in a patent infringement action for their patent on an early version of the zipper.

== See also ==
- F. B. Fetherstonhaugh
- Harold G. Fox
