= Federal Court of Appeal =

Canadian federal appeal court

Federal Court of Appeal Cour d'appel fédérale
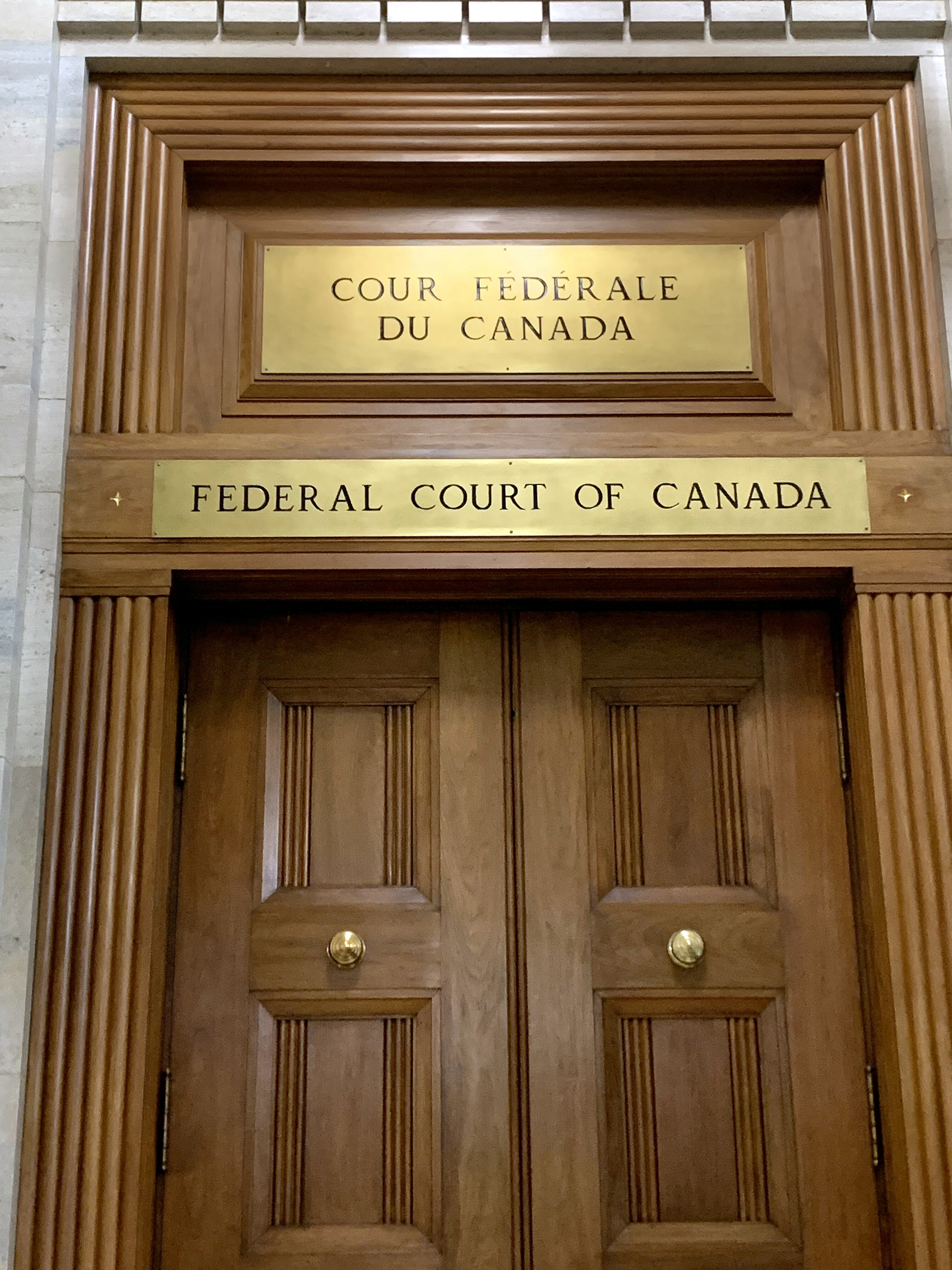
- Entrance to Federal Courtroom in the Supreme Court of Canada building
- Established: July 3, 2003; 23 years ago
- Jurisdiction: Canada
- Location: Sits across Canada
- Composition method: Appointed by Governor General on advice of federal Cabinet
- Authorized by: Constitution Act, 1867; Federal Courts Act
- Appeals to: Supreme Court of Canada
- Appeals from: Federal Court; Tax Court of Canada; Judicial review of major federal agencies
- Judge term length: Mandatory retirement at age 75
- Number of positions: Chief Justice and 14 judges, plus supernumerary positions
- Language: English and French
- Website: www.fca-caf.ca/en/home

Chief Justice
- Currently: Yves de Montigny
- Since: November 9, 2023

The Federal Court of Appeal (French: Cour d'appel fédérale) is a Canadian appellate court that hears cases concerning federal matters. It has jurisdiction to hear appeals from the federal trial court, the Federal Court, as well as the Tax Court of Canada. It also has original jurisdiction for judicial review of decisions of major federal boards, commissions and agencies. An appeal lies from the Federal Court of Appeal to the Supreme Court of Canada.

== History ==
Section 101 of the Constitution Act, 1867 empowers the Parliament of Canada to establish "additional Courts for the better Administration of the Laws of Canada". In 1971, Parliament enacted the Federal Court Act, which created the Federal Court of Canada. The new court consisted of two divisions: the Trial Division (which replaced the Exchequer Court of Canada) and the Appeal Division.

On July 2, 2003, the Federal Court Act was amended by the Courts Administration Service Act. The amendments split the Federal Court of Canada into two separate courts, with the Federal Court of Appeal succeeding the Appeal Division and the Federal Court succeeding the Trial Division.

== Structure ==
=== Judges ===
The Federal Court of Appeal consists of a chief justice and fourteen full-time judges. There is also a varying number of positions for supernumerary judges, for judges who are approaching retirement and do not wish to work full-time.

The judges are appointed by the Governor General in Council, namely the governor general of Canada acting on the advice of the federal Cabinet. Judges must have already been a judge of a superior court, or have ten years experience as a lawyer in Canada. At least five of the judges must be from Quebec.

The salaries of the judges and associate judges are reviewed every four years by the federal Judicial Compensation and Benefits Commission. The federal government then makes the decision as to the salary over the next four years. As of April 1, 2025, the chief justice and associate chief justice receive $455,000 while other judges receive $414,900 annually.

Law clerks are hired for one-year terms to help the judges research and prepare decisions. They are generally assigned to a particular judge.

=== Sittings of the court ===
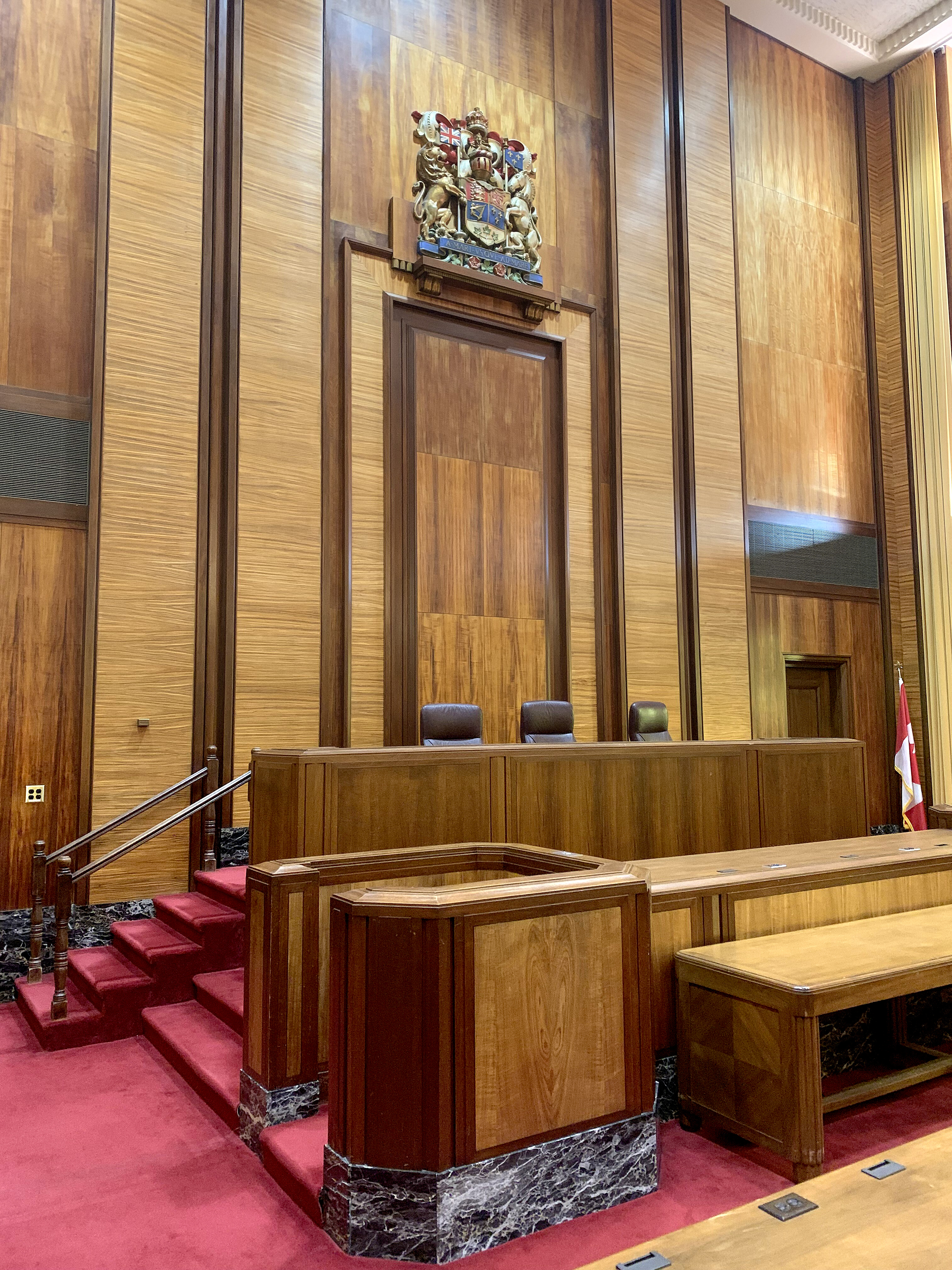
Courtroom for the Federal Court of Appeal in the Supreme Court of Canada Building

The Federal Courts Act requires that the court sit with a panel of at least three judges on all appeals and applications for judicial review. The court can sit with a larger panel, but there must always be an uneven number of judges hearing an appeal.

Although based in Ottawa, the Federal Court of Appeal sits across the country. For example, in the 2026 winter/spring session, the court scheduled hearings in Calgary, Edmonton, Halifax, Montreal, Ottawa, Toronto, and Vancouver.

=== Administration ===
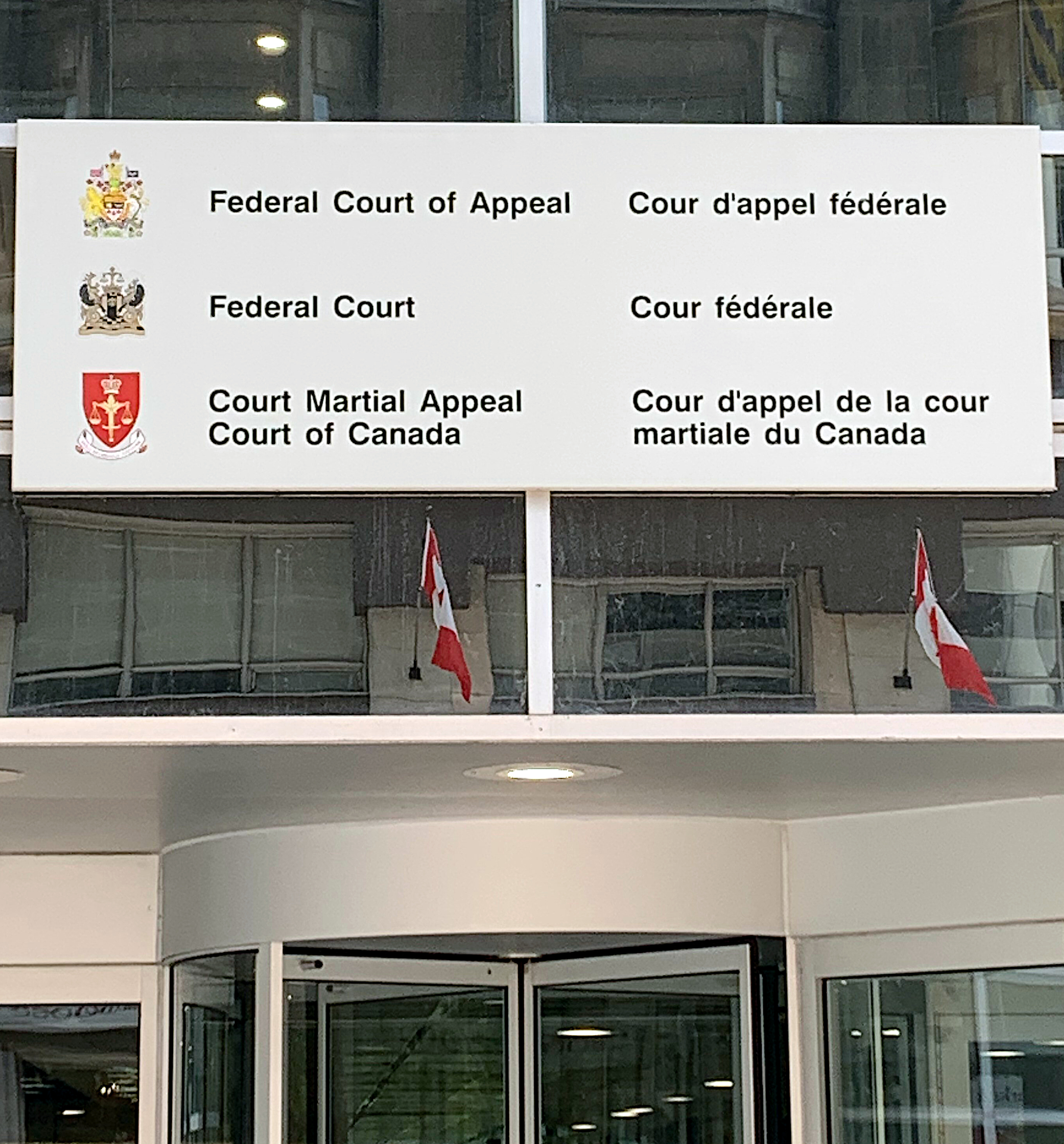
Entrance to Registry Office for the federal courts, Ottawa

The Courts Administration Service provides registry services to several federal courts, including the Federal Court of Appeal. The Federal Court of Appeal Registry is located in Ottawa, with regional offices throughout the country. The Registry in Ottawa maintains all original court files, with certified copies maintained in regional offices. The Registry provides clerical services and other administrative support to the court, and provides clerical services and procedural guidance to litigants. The Registry cannot provide legal advice to litigants or members of the public.

== Jurisdiction ==
=== Constitutional scope ===
The Supreme Court has interpreted s. 101 of the Constitution Act, 1867 to mean that Parliament can only give federal courts a statute-based jurisdiction, limited to dealing with matters arising under federal statutes. Federal courts cannot be given inherent general jurisdiction, unlike the provincial superior courts.

=== Appellate jurisdiction ===
The Federal Court of Appeal hears appeals from the Federal Court and the Tax Court of Canada. There can also be specific appeals provided by other statutes.

=== Original jurisdiction ===
The Federal Court of Appeal has original jurisdiction over applications for judicial review in respect of certain major federal tribunals.

The federal tribunals that are subject to judicial review under s. 28 of the Federal Court Act include:

- Canadian Radio-television and Telecommunications Commission
- Canadian International Trade Tribunal
- Canadian Energy Regulator
- Canada Industrial Relations Board
- Copyright Board
- Canadian Transportation Agency
- Competition Tribunal
- Public Servants Disclosure Protection Tribunal
- Specific Claims Tribunal.

The Federal Court of Appeal may also have the power of judicial review over specific types of statutory decisions by the federal Cabinet.

=== Case distribution ===
In 2025, the Federal Court of Appeal's total case distribution was as follows:

Subject Matter	Proceedings Commenced	Total Dispositions	Pending as of December 31, 2025
Federal Court (final appeals)	155	137	199
Federal Court (interlocutory appeals)	62	61	57
Tax Court of Canada	52	59	75
Statutory Appeals	17	16	25
Judicial Reviews	99	98	116
References	0	0	0
Preliminary Applications	37	36	10
TOTAL	422	407	482
Source: Federal Court of Appeal

The total dispositions can be shown as follows:

1. Federal Court (final) 137 (33.7%)
2. Judicial reviews 98 (24.1%)
3. Federal Court (interlocutory) 61 (15.0%)
4. Tax Court 59 (14.5%)
5. Preliminary applications 36 (8.85%)
6. Statutory appeals 16 (3.93%)

== Judges of the Federal Court of Appeal ==
=== Current Judges ===
Name	Date appointed	Nominated by prime minister	Position prior to appointment
Chief Justice Yves de Montigny	2023	Trudeau	Federal Court
Chief Justice Yves de Montigny	2015 (as Judge of the Court)	Harper	Federal Court
David W. Stratas	2009	Harper	Partner at Heenan Blaikie LLP
Wyman W. Webb (supernumerary)	2012	Harper	Tax Court of Canada
Donald J. Rennie	2015	Harper	Federal Court
Mary J.L. Gleason	2015	Harper	Federal Court
John B. Laskin	2017	Trudeau	Partner, Torys LLP
George R. Locke	2019	Trudeau	Federal Court
Anne Mactavish (supernumerary)	2019	Trudeau	Federal Court
René Leblanc	2020	Trudeau	Federal Court
Siobhan Monaghan	2021	Trudeau	Tax Court of Canada
Sylvie Roussel	2022	Trudeau	Federal Court
Nathalie Goyette	2022	Trudeau	Partner, Davies Ward Phillips & Vineberg
Gerald Heckman	2023	Trudeau	Professor, University of Manitoba
Monica Biringer	2023	Trudeau	Tax Court of Canada
Elizabeth Walker	2024	Trudeau	Federal Court
Vanessa Rochester	2024	Trudeau	Federal Court
Panagiotis Pamel	2024	Trudeau	Federal Court
Source: Federal Court of Appeal

=== Former Judges ===
Appointed to the Supreme Court of Canada
Former judges of the Federal Court of Canada – Appeal Division
Former judges of the Federal Court
† Died in office

Former Chief Justices of the Federal Court of Appeal
Name	Term in office
John D. Richard	July 3, 2003 – July 30, 2009 (Note: Trial Division, August 30, 1994 – June 23, 1998; Associate Chief Justice of the Federal Court of Canada, June 23, 1998 – November 3, 1999; Chief Justice of the Federal Court of Canada from November 4, 1999, until the 2003 reorganisation; Chief Justice of the Federal Court of Appeal, July 3, 2003 – July 30, 2009.)
Pierre Blais	September 9, 2009 – June 23, 2014 (Note: Trial Division, June 23, 1998 until the 2003 reorganisation, then Federal Court until February 19, 2008; Federal Court of Appeal, February 20, 2008 – September 8, 2009.)
Marc Noël	October 9, 2014 – July 31, 2023 (Note: Trial Division, June 24, 1992 – June 23, 1998; Appeal Division, June 23, 1998 until the 2003 reorganisation, then Federal Court of Appeal until October 8, 2014.)
Sources: Federal Court of Appeal & Federal Court

Former Judges of the Federal Court of Appeal
Name	Term in office
Arthur J. Stone	July 3, 2003 – November 19, 2004 (Note: Appeal Division, July 18, 1983 until the 2003 reorganisation.)
Alice Desjardins	July 3, 2003 – August 11, 2009 (Note: Appeal Division, June 29, 1987 until the 2003 reorganisation.)
Robert Décary	July 3, 2003 – July 1, 2009 (Note: Appeal Division, March 14, 1990 until the 2003 reorganisation.)
Allen M. Linden	July 3, 2003 – October 7, 2009 (Note: Appeal Division, July 5, 1990 until the 2003 reorganisation.)
Julius A. Isaac	July 3, 2003 – July 18, 2003 (Note: Chief Justice of the Federal Court of Canada, December 24, 1991 – September 1, 1999; Appeal Division, September 2, 1999 until the 2003 reorganisation.)
Gilles Létourneau	July 3, 2003 – December 31, 2012 (Note: Appeal Division, May 13, 1992 until the 2003 reorganisation.)
Barry L. Strayer	July 3, 2003 – May 1, 2004 (Note: Trial Division, July 18, 1983 – August 30, 1994; Appeal Division, August 30, 1994 until the 2003 reorganisation.)
J. Edgar Sexton	July 3, 2003 – October 10, 2011 (Note: Appeal Division, June 23, 1998 until the 2003 reorganisation.)
Marc Noël	July 3, 2003 – October 10, 2014 (Note: Trial Division, June 24, 1992 – June 23, 1998; Appeal Division June 23, 1998 until the 2003 reorganisation; appointed Chief Justice of the Federal Court of Appeal October 9, 2014.)
Marshall E. Rothstein	July 3, 2003 – March 1, 2006 (Note: Trial Division, June 24, 1992 – January 21, 1999; Appeal Division January 21 1999 until the 2003 reorganisation; Supreme Court of Canada March 1, 2006.)
Brian D. Malone	July 3, 2003 – July 27, 2007 (Note: Appeal Division November 4, 1999 until the 2003 reorganisation.)
Karen Sharlow	July 3, 2003 – September 30, 2014 (Note: Trial Division, January 21, 1999 – November 4, 1999; Appeal Division November 4, 1999 until the 2003 reorganisation.)
John Maxwell Evans	July 3, 2003 – December 31, 2013 (Note: Trial Division, June 26, 1998 – December 8, 1999; Appeal Division December 8, 1999 until the 2003 reorganisation.)
Marc Nadon	July 3, 2003 – July 25, 2021 (Note: Judge of the Trial Division, June 10, 1993 – December 14, 2001; Appeal Division until the 2003 reorganisation; nominated to the Supreme Court September 30, 2013, but nomination failed.)
J. D. Denis Pelletier	July 3, 2003 – September 1, 2023 (Note: Trial Division, February 16, 1999 – December 14, 2001; Appeal Division, December 14, 2001 until the 2003 reorganisation)
Judith M. Woods	July 3, 2003 – December 31, 2025 (Note: Appeal Division March 20, 2003 until the 2003 reorganisation)
C. Michael Ryer	October 26, 2006 – January 18, 2010; December 12, 2014 – April 30, 2016 (Note: Ryer was appointed twice to the Federal Court of Appeal, first in 2006, resigning in 2010, and then again in 2014.)
Johanne Trudel	April 26, 2007 – April 30, 2018
Carolyn Layden-Stevenson†	December 12, 2008 – June 27, 2012
Eleanor R. Dawson	December 28, 2009 – July 22, 2020 (Note: Trial Division December 8, 1999 until the 2003 reorganisation; Federal Court, July 3, 2003 – December 28, 2009.)
Robert M. Mainville	June 18, 2010 – June 30, 2014 (Note: Federal Court, June 16, 2009 – June 18, 2010.)
Johanne Gauthier	October 21, 2011 – September 1, 2023 (Note: Trial Division December 11, 2002 until the 2003 reporganisation; Federal Court, July 3, 2003 – October 21, 2011.)
David G. Near	February 8, 2013 – September 1, 2021 (Note: Federal Court, June 19, 2009 – February 7, 2013.)
André F.J. Scott	January 30, 2014 – October 22, 2018 (Note: Federal Court, October 1, 2010 – January 30, 2014.)
Richard Boivin	April 11, 2014 – September 1, 2025 (Note: Federal Court, June 19, 2009 – April 10, 2014.)
Marianne Rivoalen	September 20, 2018 – June 1, 2023
Sources: Federal Court of Appeal & Federal Court

== See also ==
- List of notable Canadian Courts of Appeal cases
