= Millennium Golden Eagle International =

Chinese media company

- Headquarters: Shouti South Road, Haidian District, Beijing, China
- Key people: Zhang Bin (political strategist)
- Subsidiaries: Millennium Golden Eagle International (Canada)

Millennium Golden Eagle International is a Chinese media company led by Zhang Bin.

It is the parent company of Millennium Golden Eagle International (Canada). The company's 2016 donation to the Pierre Elliott Trudeau Foundation made news in 2023.

== Description and organisation ==
Millennium Golden Eagle International is a Chinese media and culture company.

The company is run by Zhang Bin is and noted for its affiliation with the Government of China. The company operates the Canadian subsidiary Millennium Golden Eagle International (Canada) from a residence in the Dorval area of Montreal, Quebec and has a location in Beijing and activities in Hong Kong. The Canadian subsidiary was incorporated on April 20, 2012.

The China Cultural Industry Association website identifies the company as Millennium Golden Eagle International Media Co., Ltd. and indicates that its Beijing office is located in the Haidian District.

== Activities and history ==
In China, the company is notable for producing concerts, television productions and large scale cultural events with Chinese institutions and state broadcasters. It is the host of the China International Animation and Gaming Industry Exhibition.

In Canada, chairman Zhang Bin pledged a $200,000 donation to the Pierre Elliott Trudeau Foundation in 2016 although only $140,000 was received. The payment was made from Millennium Golden Eagle International. In 2017, Marilyn Gladu asked the Government of Canada about spending to the company.

In June 2023, Edward Johnson told a House of Commons committee that the Pierre Elliott Trudeau Foundation had returned the $140,000 donation to the company.

== See also ==
- Chinese government interference in the 2019 and 2021 Canadian federal elections
