= Extraterritoriality of Princess Margriet's birth =

1942 Canadian legislative maneuver

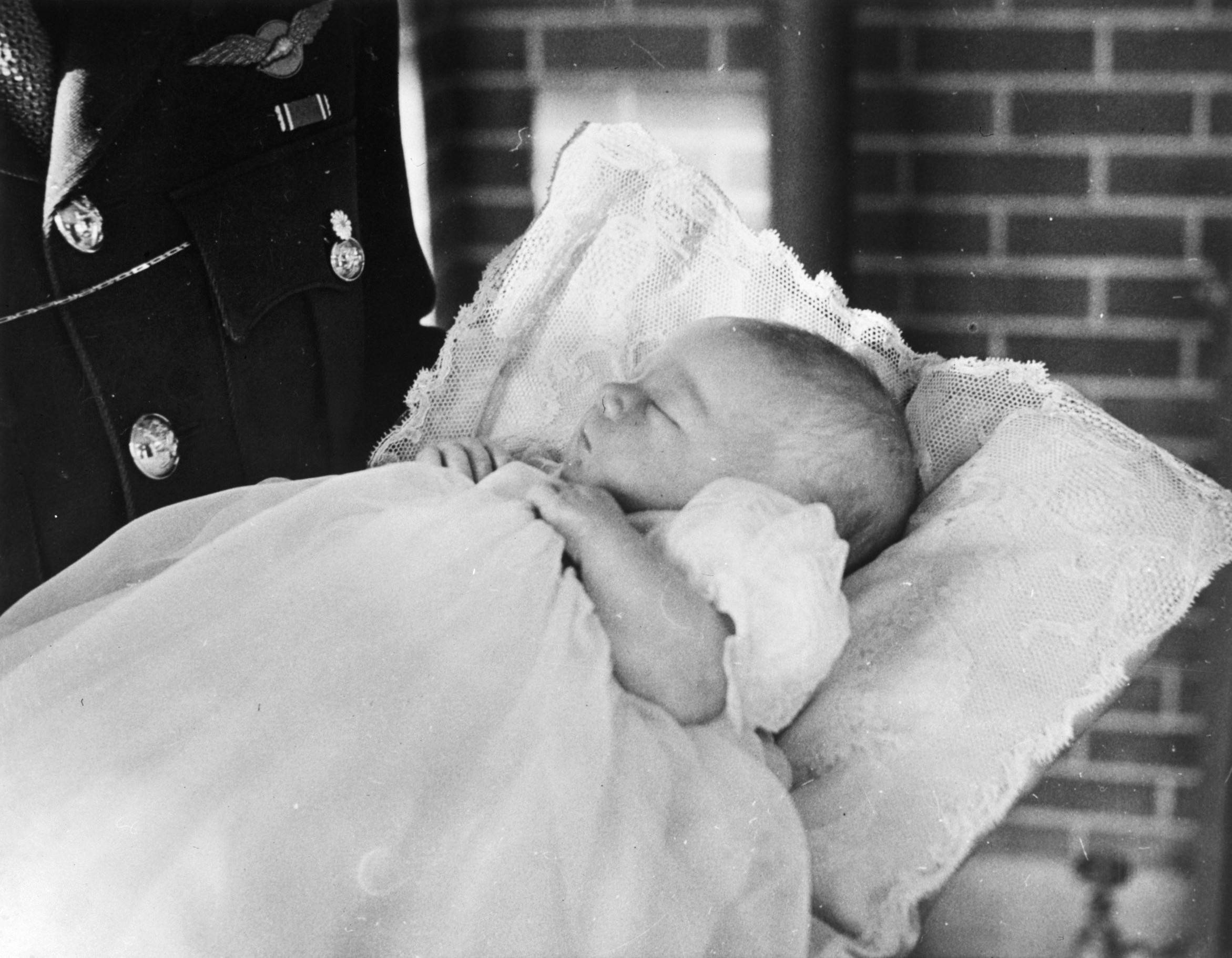
Princess Margriet, 19 January 1943

A Canadian legislative manoeuvre created a temporary extraterritorial space into which Princess Margriet of the Netherlands was born in 1943. Devised by John Erskine Read and enacted through a statutory instrument under the War Measures Act, this ensured that Margriet was not born on foreign soil, which would have made her ineligible for the royal succession under the Constitution of the Netherlands.

The enactment was unusual as it did not specify a particular date or location but amounted to a roaming bubble of extraterritoriality that would temporarily form at the time and place of the birth. Margriet's birth is considered the most significant event of the Dutch royal family's exile during the German occupation of the Netherlands, and has been cited as the turning point for the wartime morale of the Dutch people. Canada's role in hosting Princess Juliana's family and in the military liberation of the Netherlands formed the basis for strong and lasting Canada–Netherlands relations.

== Background ==
In 1940, Germany invaded the Netherlands and the Dutch royal family went into exile. Princess Juliana, daughter of Queen Wilhelmina and heir presumptive to the throne, took refuge in Ottawa, the capital of Canada. In September 1942, it was announced that Juliana was pregnant with her third child, which raised a problem for the succession. Her third child was potentially second in line to the throne if a boy or fourth in line to the throne if a girl. The Dutch constitution was clear that no person born on foreign soil could be in the royal succession. (Note: The revision of 1983 amended the exclusion criteria into Article 29 of the Constitution of the Netherlands such that an Act of Parliament requiring two-thirds majority could exclude an individual from the hereditary succession "if exceptional circumstances necessitate.")

In November, Juliana's secretary, William van Tets, contacted Canada's Department of External Affairs regarding the problem of having a Dutch royal heir born a British subject. (Note: Canada was then a dominion of the British Empire and under the principle of jus soli anyone born in Canada was legally a natural-born British subject with Canadian nationality. Canadian citizenship was non-substantive prior to passage of the Canadian Citizenship Act, 1946.) The department's legal advisor John Erskine Read devised a manner of avoiding this circumstance by enacting a temporary extraterritorial space for the birth of the heir.

A legal team led by Deputy Minister of Justice Frederick P. Varcoe wrote the legislation in the form of a proclamation which was approved by cabinet. An order-in-council was then issued through Governor General Alexander Cambridge, 1st Earl of Athlone, (Note: The governor general's wife, Princess Alice, Countess of Athlone, was Juliana's aunt, and they had initially hosted Juliana and her family at their official residence, Rideau Hall.) to enact the legislation by statutory instrument. (Note: Some media sources refer to the order as a "royal decree". However, under Canadian constitutional law, the monarch has no power to legislate; only Parliament can do so, either by a statute which directly regulates an issue, or by a statute which authorises delegated legislation, such as an order-in-council authorised by the federal Cabinet: Peter Hogg and Wade Wright, Constitutional Law of Canada, 5th ed. (Thomson Reuters (looseleaf; current to 2024)), paras. 1:9, 2:4; John Mark Keyes, Executive Legislation, 2nd ed. (LexisNexis: 2010), pp. 26-27: "Delegated".)

== Proclamation ==
Canada Gazette, Vol. LXXVI, No. 232 Extra
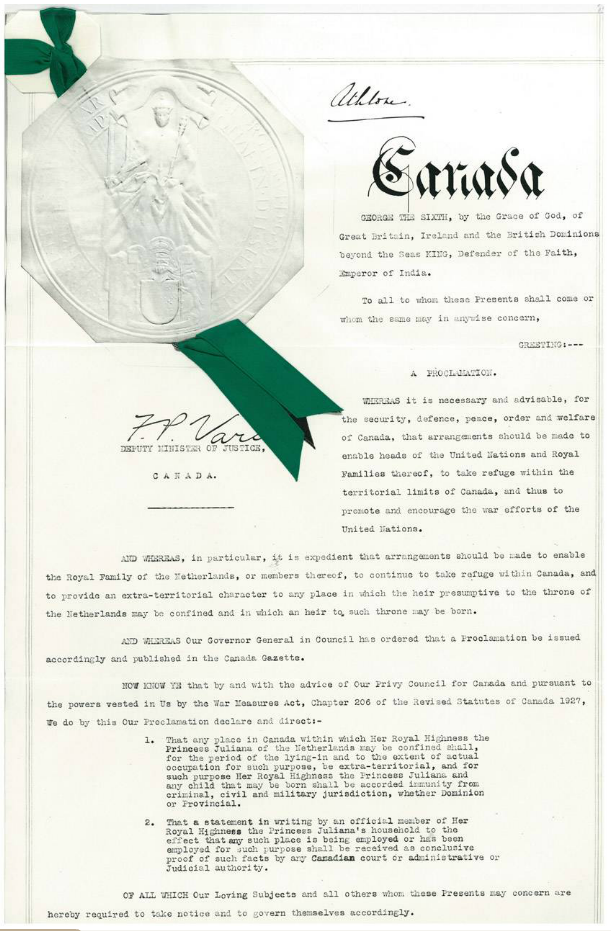
- The signed, typewritten proclamation
- Created: 27 November 1942
- Presented: 26 December 1942
- Signatories: The Earl of Athlone (Governor General of Canada); Frederick P. Varcoe (Deputy Minister of Justice of Canada, countersigned)

Full text
- Proclamation declaring the extraterritoriality of the birthplace of Princess Margriet of the Netherlands in Canada at Wikisource

The proclamation was issued in the name of George VI on 27 November 1942 and published in the Canada Gazette on 26 December.

The proclamation invoked the War Measures Act, stating that it was necessary for Canada's war effort to grant refuge to allied royal families and, in the case of the royal family of the Netherlands, "to provide extra-territorial character" for the birth of a potential heir. This statutory authority granted the proclamation the legislative equivalency of an act of parliament. (Note: In January 1943, shortly before Margriet's birth, the Supreme Court of Canada held that "The authority vested in the Governor General in Council by the War Measures Act is legislative in its character; and an order in council passed in conformity with the conditions prescribed by, and the provisions of, that Act, i.e. a legislative enactment such as should be deemed necessary and advisable by reason of war, have the effect of an Act of Parliament.")

The proclamation declared:

That any place in Canada within which Her Royal Highness the Princess Juliana of the Netherlands may be confined shall, for the period of the lying-in and to the extent of actual occupation for such purpose, be extra-territorial, and for such purpose Her Royal Highness the Princess Juliana and any child that shall be born shall be accorded immunity from criminal, civil and military jurisdiction, whether Dominion or Provincial.

== Legal effect ==
The proclamation effectively created a mobile extraterritorial bubble into which the baby would be born, which would exist for the period and purpose of childbirth. By not specifying dates or locations, it was hoped to accommodate the possibility of a sudden labour. The extraterritorial birth meant that jus soli (right of soil, a.k.a. birthright citizenship) would not apply and the child would not be born a British subject. Citizenship would instead by derived from Juliana by jus sanguinis (right of blood), making the baby solely Dutch.

Princess Juliana was admitted to Ottawa Civic Hospital on 18 January and Princess Margriet of the Netherlands was born there on 19 January 1943. She was the first member of the House of Orange-Nassau to be born outside of the Netherlands and, until 2021, was the only royal princess born in North America. (Note: Princess Lilibet of Sussex was born in the United States on 4 June 2021 and in September 2022 became a royal princess and seventh in line to the British throne.) Margriet was registered as a citizen of the Netherlands with no Canadian birth certificate, the extraterritorial circumstances reported with the announcement of her birth.

== Legacy ==
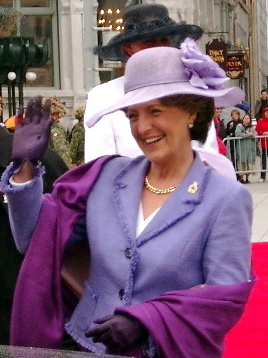
Princess Margriet in Ottawa for the 2002 Tulip Festival

The day after Margriet's birth, the Dutch flag was flown from the Peace Tower at Parliament Hill; as of 2025 this remains the only time a foreign flag had flown there. She was named for the marguerite (daisy), a symbol of the Dutch resistance, and news of the birth provided a major morale boost in occupied Netherlands. Dutch Minister to Canada F. E. H. Groeman declared "1943 is the year of our rising hope." Margriet's birth, according to James Powell, "helped cement a lasting bond between the peoples of Canada and the Netherlands", displayed prominently in the Canadian Tulip Festival.

A widely reported myth emerged that a room (or as much as the entire maternity ward) of Ottawa Civic Hospital was temporarily declared Dutch territory for the birth. However, it is not within the power of the Canadian government to declare any part of Canada the territory of another nation.

The international border shifting inspired the screenwriter of Passport to Pimlico, a 1949 British comedy in which a section of London is discovered to be outside the United Kingdom's jurisdiction.
