= Exchequer Court of Canada =

Former federal court of Canada (1875–1971)

Exchequer Court of Canada Cour de la Échiquier du Canada
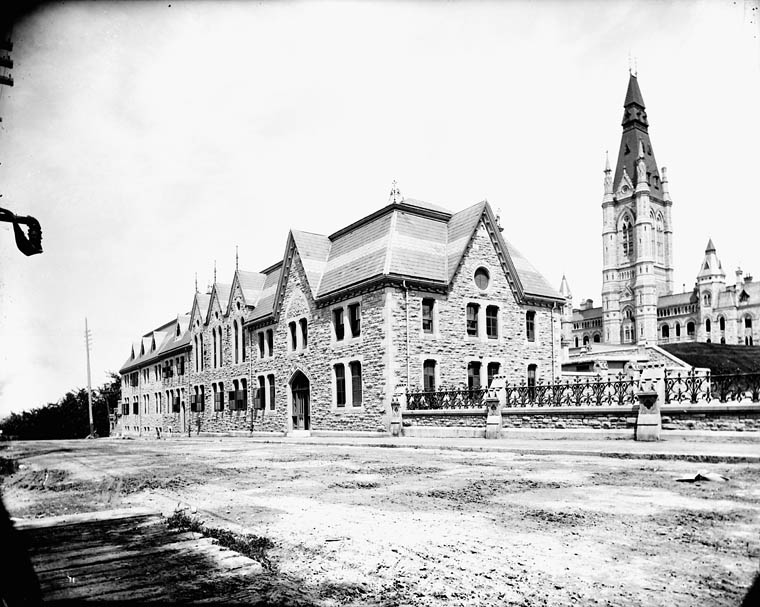
- Old Supreme Court building, which also housed the Exchequer Court
- Established: April 8, 1875; 151 years ago
- Dissolved: June 1, 1971; 55 years ago
- Jurisdiction: Canada
- Location: Ottawa, Ontario, but also sat in other locations across Canada
- Composition method: Appointed by the Governor General of Canada, on advice of the Cabinet of Canada
- Authorized by: Constitution Act, 1867 and Supreme and Exchequer Court Act (1875)
- Appeals to: Supreme Court of Canada; Judicial Committee of the Privy Council
- Appeals from: Official arbitrators; Local judges in admiralty
- Judge term length: 1875 to 1927: Life tenure; 1927 to 1971: Mandatory retirement at age 75
- Number of positions: 1875 to 1887: Judges of the Supreme Court of Canada exercised duties of Exchequer Court; 1887 to 1912: One judge; 1912 to 1920: One judge and one assistant judge; 1920 to 1971: President and one puisne judge; gradual expansion to the president and seven puisne judges
- Language: English and French
- Type of tribunal: Law and equity; federal revenue issues

The Exchequer Court of Canada was a federal court of Canada which existed from 1875 to 1971. A superior court, its jurisdiction primarily related to civil actions involving the federal government and federal tax and revenue matters. It also had jurisdiction involving private parties in areas of law within federal jurisdiction, such as admiralty law, a limited insolvency jurisdiction, intellectual property law, and a limited divorce jurisdiction. Although based in Ottawa, the court heard cases across the country, with the judges travelling to different centres where cases arose.

Parliament created the Exchequer Court in 1875, in the same statute which created the Supreme Court of Canada: The Supreme and Exchequer Court Act. Originally, there were no separate judges appointed to the Exchequer Court; the judges of the Supreme Court were also the judges of the Exchequer Court. George Burbidge was the first person appointed solely as a judge of the Exchequer Court, in 1887. Parliament authorised the appointment of an assistant judge in 1912, and in 1920 created the position of President of the Exchequer Court. By 1971, the Court consisted of the president and seven judges.

In 1971, Parliament passed a major restructuring act, the Federal Court Act, which continued the Exchequer Court as the Federal Court of Canada. The new court consisted of two divisions, the trial division and the appellate division, with an expanded jurisdiction and a greater number of judges.

== Constitutional basis ==
At the time of Canadian Confederation in 1867, the original provinces (Ontario, Quebec, Nova Scotia and New Brunswick) had separate court systems. There were no courts that had jurisdiction across British North America. During the negotiations leading to Confederation, the Fathers of Confederation agreed that the new federal Parliament would have the power to create federal courts to deal with matters relating to federal law.

The Constitution Act, 1867 thus provided under s. 101 that:

101 The Parliament of Canada may, notwithstanding anything in this Act, from Time to Time provide for the Constitution, Maintenance, and Organization of a General Court of Appeal for Canada, and for the Establishment of any additional Courts for the better Administration of the Laws of Canada.

The phrase "any additional Courts for the better Administration of the Laws of Canada" gave the federal Parliament the power to create new federal courts, such as the Exchequer Court.

== Creation of the Exchequer Court ==
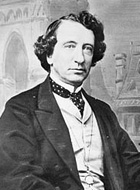
Prime Minister John A. Macdonald, who introduced two bills to try to establish a federal court

The Exchequer Court was not established until 1875. Between 1869 and 1873 Prime Minister John A. Macdonald attempted to create a supreme court and a federal court under the powers granted to Parliament by s. 101 of the Constitution Act, 1867. However, these early attempts were rebuffed due to concerns over jurisdiction, particularly because the early proposals would have established a supreme court exercising both original (trial) jurisdiction and concurrent appellate jurisdiction, potentially in conflict with the existing provincial courts.

As an interim step, in 1867 Parliament created a system of official arbitrators for claims against the federal government relating to public works. In 1879, Parliament created a right of appeal from the official arbitrators to the new Exchequer Court, in cases involving $500 or more.

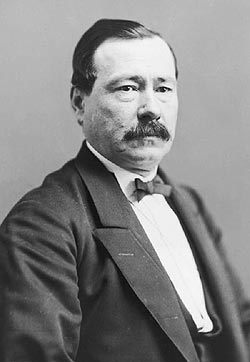
Minister of Justice Télesphore Fournier, who introduced The Supreme and Exchequer Court Act in 1875, and later sat as a judge of the Exchequer Court

In 1875, the Liberal government of Prime Minister Alexander Mackenzie passed The Supreme and Exchequer Court Act. The bill was introduced by Minister of Justice Télesphore Fournier, and was based on Macdonald's earlier unsuccessful bill of 1870. This act created the Supreme Court of Canada, and also the Exchequer Court. As the name suggests, the Exchequer Court was inspired by the Court of Exchequer in England, which primarily dealt with revenue cases of the British government. The new Canadian court was a superior court, although of limited jurisdiction.

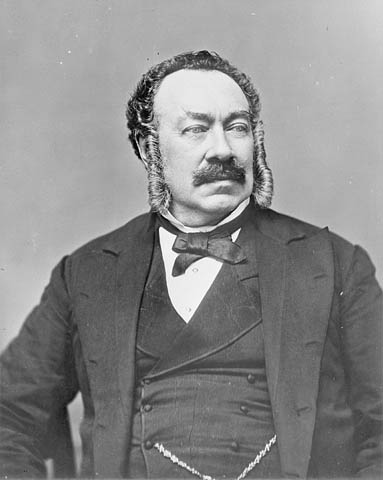
Justice Henry of the Supreme Court of Canada, who sat on three appeals from his own decisions on the Exchequer Court, and was overturned by the Supreme Court each time

Although the Exchequer Court was a separate court from the Supreme Court of Canada, when it was first set up it did not have its own judges. The judges of the Supreme Court were also the judges of the Exchequer Court for the first twelve years of the Exchequer Court's existence. That included Justice Télesphore Fournier, who was one of the first appointments to the Supreme Court, and thus automatically a judge of the Exechequer Court. Individual judges from the Supreme Court would be assigned to hear a particular case, with the possibility of an appeal to the Supreme Court. This meant that a Supreme Court judge could sit on appeal from his own decision as a judge of the Exchequer Court. For instance, on three occasions Justice Henry of the Supreme Court sat on appeals from his own decisions as an Exchequer Court judge. In all three cases, the Supreme Court overturned the Exchequer Court decisions, with Henry dissenting.

The two courts were not fully separated until 1887, when Parliament passed a separate statute for the Exchequer Court, taking all of the provisions relating to the Exchequer Court out of the former Supreme and Exchequer Court Act. As part of the separation, the new act authorised the appointment of a single judge for the Exchequer Court, and relieved Supreme Court judges from sitting on the Exchequer Court. George W. Burbidge, the federal deputy minister of justice, was the first Exchequer Court judge appointed under this new arrangement.

Nor did the Exchequer Court have its own building when founded. The judges of the Supreme Court were located in a small building immediately to the west of the Parliament buildings. Even after the Exchequer Court received its own judge in 1887, the Exchequer Court offices continued to be in the original Supreme Court building. The Exchequer Court judge could only use the courtroom when the Supreme Court was not sitting.

== Jurisdiction of the Exchequer Court ==
=== Territorial jurisdiction ===
The Exchequer Court had territorial jurisdiction over all of Canada, and could hear suits anywhere in Canada. In addition to Ottawa, from an early stage judges travelled to hear suits in Toronto, Montreal and Halifax. By 1970, the court had opened registry offices across the country.

=== Revenue and civil jurisdiction ===
The jurisdiction of the Exchequer Court initially consisted of:

- exclusive jurisdiction over any claims against the federal government in relation to federal revenue, such as taxes;
- concurrent jurisdiction with the provincial superior courts in cases relating to the enforcement of the federal revenue laws; and
- concurrent jurisdiction with the provincial superior courts over civil cases brought by the federal government either at common law or in equity.

In 1887, when the Exchequer Court received its own judge, Parliament expanded the court's jurisdiction to include exclusive original jurisdiction over all claims against the federal government.

=== Admiralty jurisdiction ===
Prior to Confederation in 1867, the British Parliament conferred admiralty jurisdiction on various courts throughout the British Empire by means of the Vice Admiralty Courts Act 1863. By this statute, the superior courts in the provinces of British Columbia, Lower Canada (later Quebec), New Brunswick, Nova Scotia, and Prince Edward Island were constituted British vice-admiralty courts.

The British statute did not recognize any court in Ontario as an admiralty court. In 1877, the Parliament of Canada responded to this situation by creating the Maritime Court of Ontario, using its authority under s. 91 and s. 101 of the Constitution Act, 1867 to pass the Maritime Jurisdiction Act, 1877. In 1879, the Supreme Court unanimously held this act was a valid exercise of federal jurisdiction.

In 1890, the British Parliament passed the Colonial Courts of Admiralty Act 1890, which authorised British possessions to create their own courts of admiralty jurisdiction, equivalent to the admiralty jurisdiction of the High Court in England. The Parliament of Canada responded to this act the next year by enacting the Admiralty Act, 1891, which consolidated all admiralty jurisdiction throughout Canada in the Exchequer Court, with local judges in admiralty drawn from the provincial courts. By the combined effect of the British and federal statutes, the Exchequer Court could "exercise such jurisdiction in like manner and to as full an extent as the High Court in England, and shall have the same regard as that Court to international law and the comity of nations."

However, in 1927 the Judicial Committee of the Privy Council held that this grant of jurisdiction did not exceed what existed on July 1, 1891. In 1931, the Statute of Westminster, 1931 eliminated any remaining restrictions on the power of the Dominions such as Canada to control their own admiralty jurisdiction. Three years later, Canada passed the Admiralty Act, 1934, which conferred general jurisdiction over admiralty on the Exchequer Court. The court also had appellate jurisdiction over the local district judges in admiralty appointed under the act.

=== Patents, trademarks and copyrights ===
In 1890, Parliament amended the act to give the Exchequer Court jurisdiction over disputes between private parties of patents, trademarks and copyrights.

=== Title to land ===
In 1890, Parliament gave the court jurisdiction over disputes about claims for unissued patents to public land.

=== Jurisdiction over railway insolvency ===
Beginning in 1901, federally regulated railways gained the ability under the Railway Act to apply to the Exchequer Court to secure a scheme of arrangement in the event of insolvency.

=== Prize Court ===
In 1945, Parliament enacted the Canada Prize Act, which gave the Exchequer Court jurisdiction over claims of naval prizes during wartime. Only three cases were litigated under the statute, relating to claims dating from World War I.

=== Competition and criminal law ===
In 1960, the Exchequer Court for the first time was given a limited criminal jurisdiction, in relation to certain offences under the Combines Investigation Act.

=== Divorce ===
In 1968, Parliament enacted the first uniform Divorce Act that applied to all of Canada. The act created a divorce division in the Exchequer Court. The division had jurisdiction over divorces where the parties each filed a petition for divorce in separate provinces on exactly the same day and neither abandoned their petition within 30 days. The divorce division also acted as the divorce court for Quebec or Newfoundland, if the courts of those two provinces were not designated as divorce courts under the act.

== Judges of the Court ==
=== Supreme Court judges as judges of the Exchequer Court ===
When the Exchequer Court was created in 1875, the judges of the Supreme Court were also the judges of the Exchequer Court. They filled that role until 1887, when Parliament provided for the appointment of a single judge of the Exchequer Court.

To be appointed a judge of the Supreme Court, and thus also of the Exchequer Court, candidates had to have been a judge of a provincial superior court, or have at least ten years standing as a member of the bar of one of the provinces. Two of the judges had to be appointed from the Quebec courts or the bar of Quebec. The appointment was by the Crown, on the advice of the federal Cabinet. Their salaries were guaranteed as charges on the federal Consolidated Revenue Fund. They held their appointments for life, during good behaviour, but could be removed by the Governor General of Canada on addresses from the House of Commons and the Senate.

Chief Justices of the Exchequer Court, 1875 – 1887
Name	Term Began	Term Ended
Sir William Buell Richards	September 30, 1875	January 10, 1879 (Note: Resigned position.)
Sir William Johnstone Ritchie	January 11, 1879	September 30, 1887 (Note: Ceased to hold office when Exchequer Court was split from Supreme Court.)
Source: Exchequer Court Reports, 1875 to 1887

Puisne Justices of the Exchequer Court, 1875 – 1887
Name	Term Began	Term Ended
William Johnstone Ritchie	September 30, 1875	January 11, 1879 (Note: Appointed Chief Justice of the Exchequer Court.)
Samuel Henry Strong	September 30, 1875	September 30, 1887
Jean-Thomas Taschereau	September 30, 1875	October 6, 1878
Télesphore Fournier	October 8, 1875	September 30, 1887
William Alexander Henry	September 30, 1875	September 30, 1887
Henri-Elzéar Taschereau	October 7, 1878	September 30, 1887
John Wellington Gwynne	January 14, 1879	September 30, 1887
Source: Exchequer Court Reports, 1875 to 1887

=== Judges of the Exchequer Court ===
==== Appointment and tenure of office ====
In 1887, Parliament passed a statute to separate the Supreme Court from the Exchequer Court. The statute authorised the Governor in Council to appoint a single judge of the Exchequer Court, dedicated solely to that court's business. As with the former act, the judge had to have been a judge of a provincial superior court, or have ten years seniority at the bar of a province. The judge held office during good behaviour for life. George Wheelock Burbidge, the federal deputy minister of Justice, was appointed as the first full-time judge of the Court.

==== Expansion of the court ====
In 1912, Parliament amended the act to provide for an assistant judge, followed in 1920 by an amendment to create the office of president of the court, with one puisne judge. In 1927, Parliament amended the act to create mandatory retirement at age 75.

As time passed, the number of judges was gradually increased, until by 1971, when the Exchequer Court was continued as the Federal Court of Canada, the court consisted of the president and seven puisne judges.

Puisne Judges of the Exchequer Court, 1887 – 1971
Name	Term Began	Term Ended
George Wheelock Burbidge	October 1, 1887	February 18, 1908 (Note: Died in office.)
Sir Thomas Wardlaw Taylor	January 21, 1908	March 2, 1908 (Note: Commission pro tem.)
Walter G. P. Cassels	March 2, 1908	1920 (Note: Appointed President of the Exchequer Court; date uncertain.)
Louis Arthur Audette	April 4, 1912	December 1, 1931 (Note: Assistant Judge, 1912 to 1920.) (Note: Mandatory retirement at age 75.)
Eugène-Real Angers	February 1, 1932	Between 1951 and 1955 (Note: There is a four-year gap in the Exchequer Court Reports. Angers is shown as a judge in the 1951 reports, but not in the 1955 reports.)
C. Gerald O'Connor	April 19, 1945	November 16, 1949
John Charles Alexander Cameron	September 4, 1946	1964 (Note: Date uncertain.)
Maynard B. Archibald	July 1, 1948	1950
John Doherty Kearney	November 1, 1951	February 27, 1968
Alphonse Fournier	June 12, 1953	October 8, 1961
Jacques Dumoulin	December 1, 1955	June 1, 1971 (Note: Appointed to the Federal Court of Canada – Appeal Division.)
Arthur Louis Thurlow	August 29, 1956	June 1, 1971
Camilien Noël	March 12, 1962	June 1, 1971 (Note: Appointed Associate Chief Justice of the Federal Court of Canada.)
Angus Alexander Cattanach	March 27, 1962	June 1, 1971 (Note: Appointed to the Federal Court of Canada – Trial Division.)
Hugh Francis Gibson	May 4, 1964	June 1, 1971
Allison Arthur Mariotti Walsh	July 1, 1964	June 1, 1971
Roderick Kerr	November 1, 1967	June 1, 1971
Source: Exchequer Court Reports, 1887 to 1970

==== Presidents of the Exchequer Court of Canada ====
In 1920, the position of president of the Exchequer Court was established.

Presidents of the Exchequer Court, 1920 – 1971
Name	Term Began	Term Ended
Sir Walter G. P. Cassels	1920	March 1, 1923
Alexander Kenneth Maclean	November 2, 1923	July 31, 1942
Joseph Thorarinn Thorson	October 6, 1942	March 15, 1964
Wilbur Roy Jackett	May 4, 1964	June 1, 1971 (Note: Appointed Chief Justice of the Federal Court of Canada.)
Source: Exchequer Court Reports, 1921 to 1970
