= Driedger =

Driedger is a surname. Notable people with the surname include:

- Albert Driedger (born 1936), Canadian politician
- Chris Driedger (born 1994), Canadian ice hockey goaltender
- Elmer Driedger (1913–1985), Canadian lawyer
- Herold Driedger (born 1942), Canadian politician
- MaryLou Driedger (born 1953), Canadian Young Adult fiction author
- Myrna Driedger (born 1952), Canadian politician
