= Morris Rosenberg =

Canadian civil servant

Morris Rosenberg CM
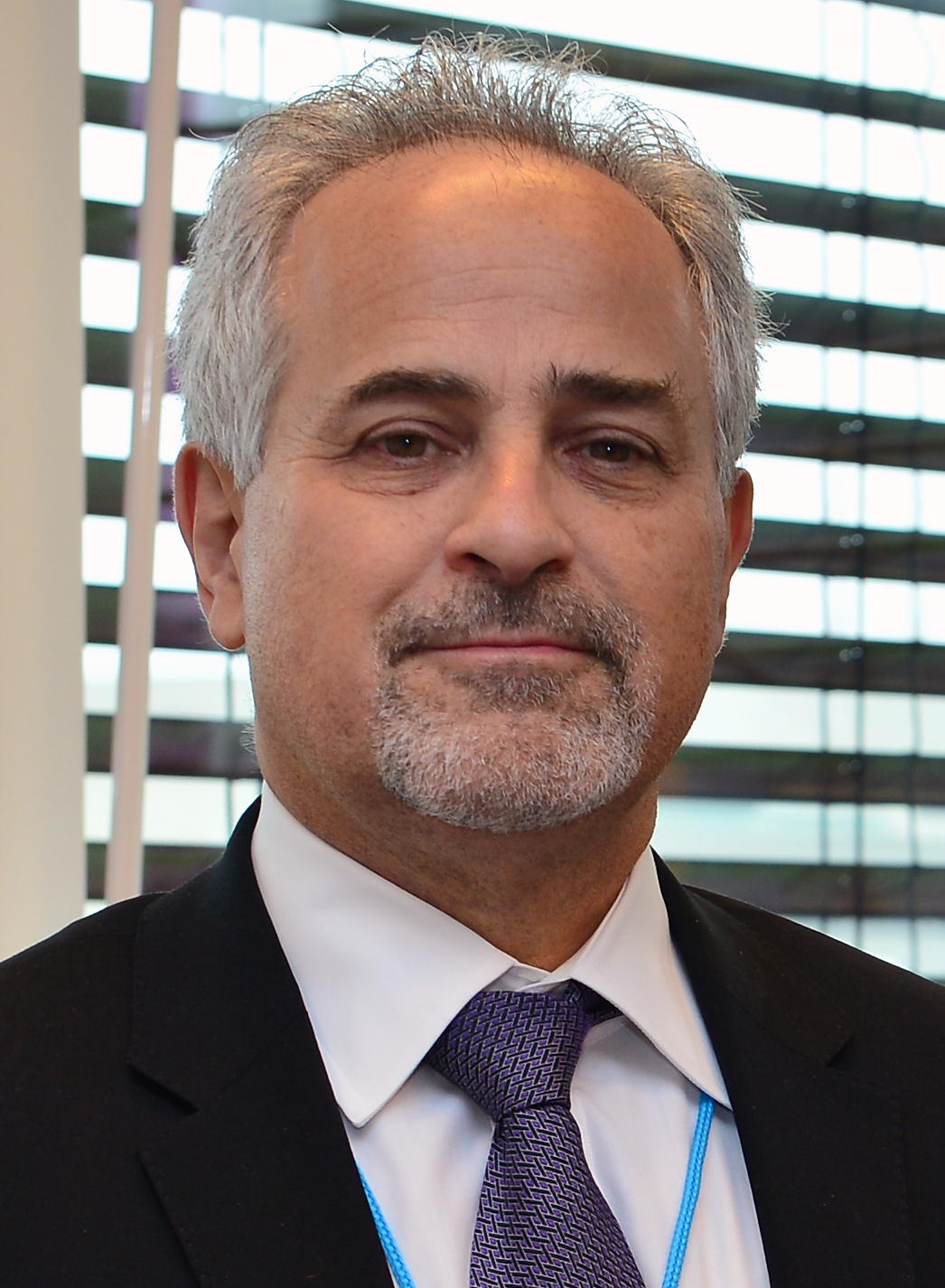
- Rosenberg in 2013

Deputy Minister of Foreign Affairs
- Incumbent
- Assumed office June 4, 2010
- Minister: Lawrence Cannon; John Baird
- Preceded by: Leonard J. Edwards

Deputy Minister of Health
- In office December 2004 – June 2010
- Minister: Ujjal Dosanjh; Tony Clement; Leona Aglukkaq

Deputy Minister of Justice and Deputy Attorney General
- In office July 1998 – December 2004
- Minister: Anne McLellan; Martin Cauchon; Irwin Cotler

Deputy Secretary to the Cabinet (Operations)
- In office 1996–1998

Personal details
- Education: McGill University; Université de Montréal; Harvard University
- Occupation: Lawyer, civil servant

Morris Rosenberg had a 34-year career in the Canada with the Government of Canada. A lawyer by background, Mr. Rosenberg served in several departments including the Department of Justice, the Trade Negotiations Office, the Department of Consumer and Corporate Affairs, the Privy Council Office, Health Canada, and the Department of Foreign Affairs and International Trade. He was Deputy Minister of 3 departments over a 15-year period. He served as Deputy Minister of Justice and Deputy Attorney General of Canada from 1998 to 2004, as Deputy Minister of Health from 2004 to 2010, and as Deputy Minister of Foreign Affairs from 2010 to 2013.

Mr. Rosenberg was appointed as President and Chief Executive Officer of the Pierre Elliott Trudeau Foundation in 2014 and served in that role until July 2018. During his time as CEO of the Trudeau Foundation, Mr. Rosenberg accepted a $200,000 donation from Chinese Billionaire Zhang Bin at the direction of the Chinese government, with the promise that the Chinese government would repay the donation. The donation was subsequently returned by the foundation.

Mr. Rosenberg holds a B.A from McGill University, an LL.L from the Université de Montréal and an LL.M from Harvard University.

In 2015, he was appointed as a Member of the Order of Canada. He currently resides in Ottawa, Ontario.

Mr. Rosenberg was recruited by Justin Trudeau to author a report on foreign interference in the 2021 Canadian federal election. The report concluded that foreign interference did not alter the outcome of the 2021 election, but Mr. Rosenberg's impartiality in preparing the report was questioned by the Conservative Party due to his acceptance of a $200,000 directed donation from the Chinese government while CEO of the Trudeau Foundation.
