= Mike Waltz =

American politician and diplomat (born 1974)

- Official portrait, 2025

32nd United States Ambassador to the United Nations
- Incumbent
- Assumed office September 21, 2025
- President: Donald Trump
- Deputy: Dorothy Shea; Tammy Bruce
- Preceded by: Linda Thomas-Greenfield

29th United States National Security Advisor
- In office January 20, 2025 – May 1, 2025
- President: Donald Trump
- Deputy: Alex Wong
- Preceded by: Jake Sullivan
- Succeeded by: Marco Rubio

Member of the U.S. House of Representatives from Florida's 6th district
- In office January 3, 2019 – January 20, 2025
- Preceded by: Ron DeSantis
- Succeeded by: Randy Fine

Personal details
- Born: Michael George Glen Waltz; January 31, 1974 (age 52) Boynton Beach, Florida, U.S.
- Party: Republican
- Spouse: Julia Nesheiwat (m. 2021)
- Children: 2
- Education: Virginia Military Institute (BA)

Military service
- Allegiance: United States
- Branch/service: United States Army
- Years of service: 1996–2000 (active); 2000–2023 (guard)
- Rank: Colonel
- Unit: U.S. Army Special Forces
- Battles/wars: War in Afghanistan
- Awards: Bronze Star (4)
- Waltz's voice Waltz on the 77th anniversary of Jordanian independence Recorded May 25, 2023

Michael George Glen Waltz (born January 31, 1974) is an American politician, diplomat, businessman, author, and former Army Special Forces officer who has served as the 32nd United States ambassador to the United Nations since September 2025 in the second Trump administration. He previously served as the 29th national security advisor from January to May 2025 and was the U.S. representative for Florida's 6th congressional district from 2019 to 2025.

In 2018, Waltz was elected to the House of Representatives, defeating former ambassador Nancy Soderberg and succeeding Ron DeSantis, who was elected governor of Florida that same year. Waltz was re-elected in 2020, 2022, and 2024. He was chair of the House Armed Services Subcommittee on Readiness for the 118th United States Congress. Waltz was considered one of Congress's most hawkish members with regard to China, believing the Chinese Communist Party (CCP) is in a cold war with the U.S. and the West.

In 2021, Waltz was the first member of Congress to call for a full U.S. boycott of the 2022 Winter Olympics in Beijing over what he described as the CCP's genocide and internment of Chinese Uyghur populations and the enslavement, forced labor, and re-education camps of ethnic minorities in China. On November 12, 2024, President-elect Trump announced he would appoint Waltz to serve as national security advisor (NSA) in his second administration. Waltz resigned his House seat prior to taking office on January 20, 2025.

On May 1, 2025, it was reported that Waltz, along with Deputy National Security Advisor Alex Wong, would leave their posts following group chat leaks on the messaging platform Signal. Waltz served as NSA for 101 days, the second shortest tenure for a non-acting officeholder in the position (Mike Flynn, Trump's initial first term NSA, lasted 24 days). The same day, Trump announced via social media that he intended to nominate Waltz to serve as Ambassador to the United Nations (replacing the withdrawn nomination of Elise Stefanik) and that Marco Rubio would take on an acting role as National Security Advisor.

== Early life and education (1974–1996) ==
Waltz was born on January 31, 1974, to a single mother in Boynton Beach, Florida, and grew up in Jacksonville, where he graduated from Stanton College Preparatory School. He earned a Bachelor of Arts degree in international studies from the Virginia Military Institute in 1996, graduating with honors as a Distinguished Military Graduate.

== Military career (1996–2023) ==
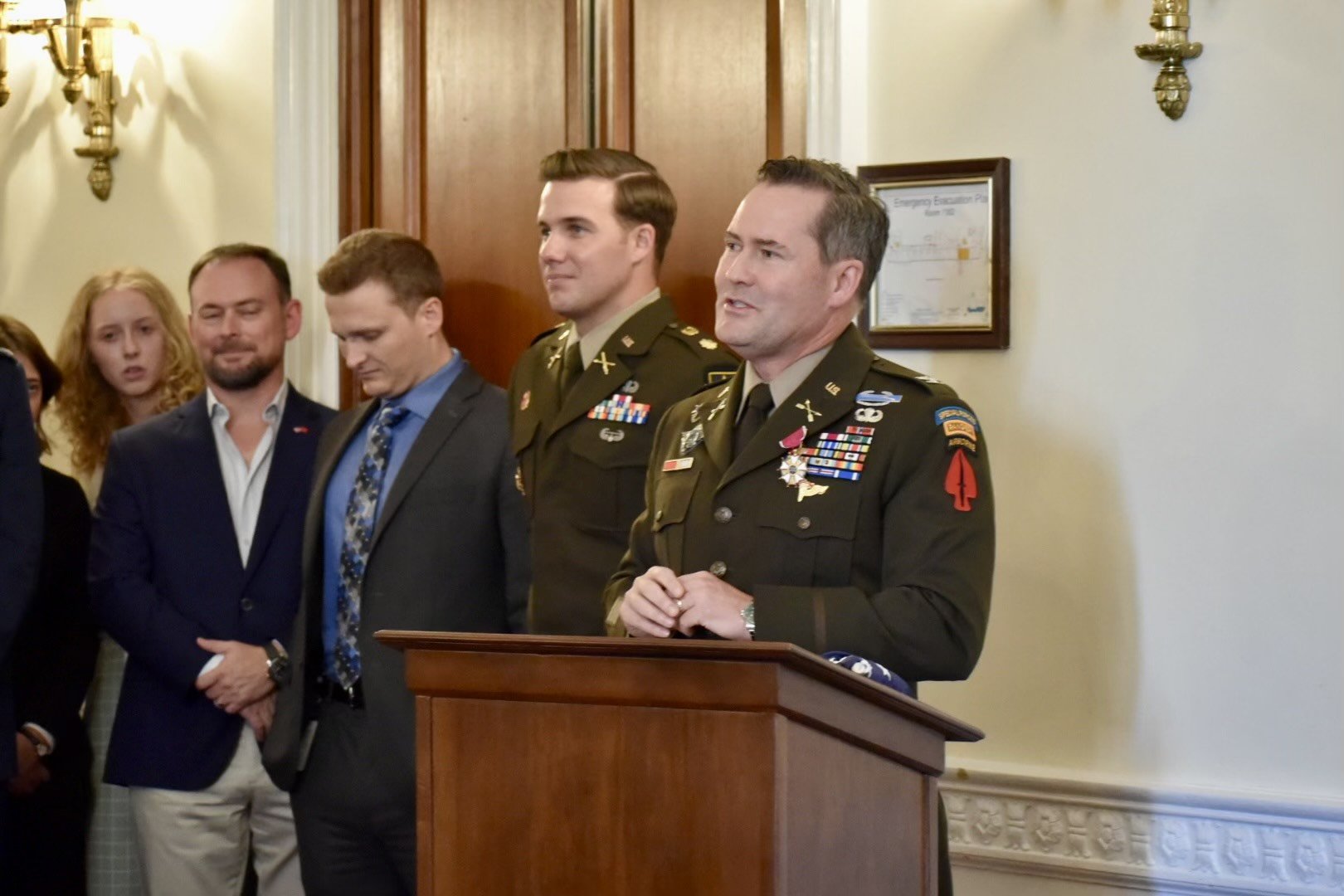
Waltz retiring from the U.S. Army, 2023

Waltz was commissioned as an armor officer in the U.S. Army in 1996. He served on active duty in the Army from 1996 to 2000, including as an M1A1 Abrams tank platoon leader, and later graduated from Ranger School and graduated from the Special Forces Qualification Course. Waltz subsequently served as a Green Beret, deploying multiple times to Afghanistan, the Middle East and Africa. For his actions in combat, Waltz was decorated with four Bronze Stars, including two for valor.

From 2002 to 2011 and 2016 to 2023, Waltz served in Company B, 2nd Battalion, 20th Special Forces Army National Guard and Special Operations Detachment-NATO in the MD-ARNG. From 2012 to 2015, he served with Special Operations Detachment-Africa in the TX-ARNG.

He was the first Army Special Forces soldier to be elected to Congress. He served in the Bush administration as a defense policy director in the Pentagon and as counterterrorism advisor to Vice President Dick Cheney.

Waltz worked in the Pentagon as a defense policy director for secretaries of defense Donald Rumsfeld and Robert Gates. He went on to serve in the White House as the vice president's counterterrorism advisor.

Upon becoming the national security advisor under President Donald Trump, Waltz retired from the Army National Guard at the rank of colonel.

== U.S. House of Representatives (2019–2025) ==
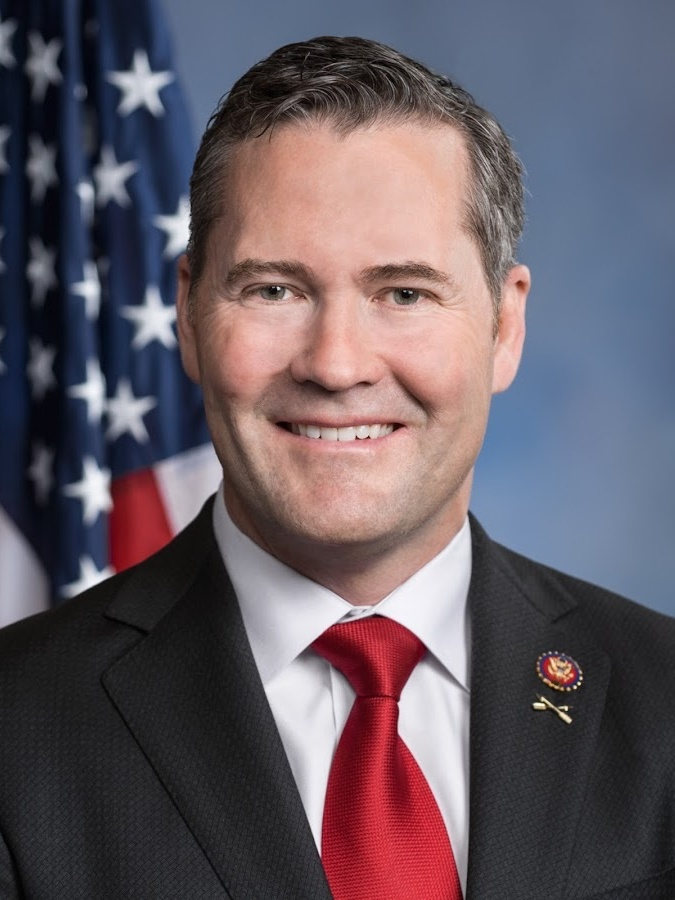
Waltz's official portrait for the 116th Congress

=== Elections ===
==== 2018 ====
Waltz ran for Florida's 6th congressional district in 2018 to succeed incumbent Republican Ron DeSantis, who retired before being elected governor of Florida. He defeated John Ward and Fred Costello in the Republican primary before facing Democratic nominee Nancy Soderberg, a former Alternate US Ambassador to the United Nations and the former deputy national security advisor, in the general election. Waltz won with 56.31% of the vote to Soderberg's 43.69%.

==== 2020 ====
Waltz was challenged by Democratic nominee Clint Curtis. He received 265,393 votes (60.64%) to Curtis's 172,305 (39.36%).

=== Tenure in Congress ===
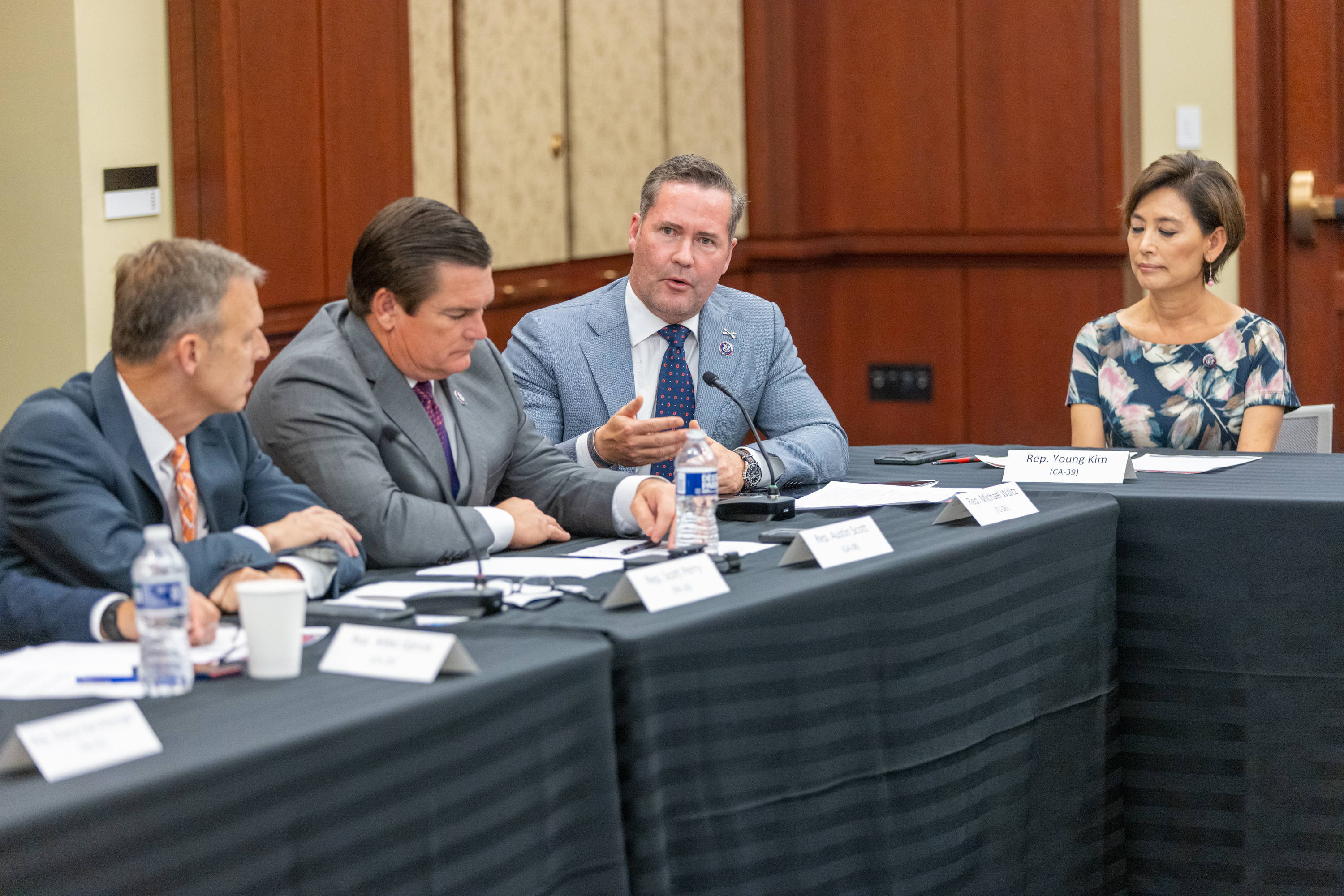
Waltz during the 117th Congress

Waltz was sworn in to the 116th United States Congress on January 3, 2019.

In April 2020, Waltz joined the National Guard's COVID-19 response efforts as a colonel on the planning staff. On November 6, 2020, during the COVID-19 pandemic, he tested positive for the virus.

In December 2020, Waltz was one of 126 Republican members of the House of Representatives to sign an amicus brief in support of Texas v. Pennsylvania, a lawsuit filed at the United States Supreme Court contesting the results of the 2020 presidential election, in which Joe Biden defeated incumbent Donald Trump. The Supreme Court declined to hear the case on the basis that Texas lacked standing under Article III of the Constitution to challenge the results of an election held by another state. Shortly thereafter, the Orlando Sentinel editorial board rescinded its endorsement of Waltz in the 2020 election. They wrote, "We had no idea, had no way of knowing at the time, that Waltz was not committed to democracy." Ultimately, Waltz voted to confirm the electoral victory of Joe Biden.

Along with all other Senate and House Republicans, Waltz voted against the American Rescue Plan Act of 2021.

On May 19, 2021, Waltz voted against legislation to establish the formation of a January 6 commission meant to investigate the storming of the U.S. Capitol.

On July 29, 2024, Waltz was announced as one of seven Republican members of a bipartisan task force investigating the attempted assassination of Donald Trump.

After multiple major hurricanes impacted Florida's coastal regions over consecutive years, Waltz pressed for streamlining FEMA reimbursements for local governments to speed up debris removal and infrastructure repairs. He co-sponsored the Federal Disaster Tax Relief Act and pushed for supplemental disaster funding to support farmers in the citrus and dairy industries.

==== Agriculture ====
In October 2023, Waltz wrote a letter with 15 other House Republicans to the House Committee on Agriculture opposing the inclusion of the Ending Agricultural Trade Suppression (EATS) Act in the 2023 farm bill. The EATS Act would have preempted state and local laws regulating agricultural goods sold in interstate commerce, including the California farm animal welfare law Proposition 12. The letter argued that the legislation would infringe on states' rights and undermine U.S. national security by unfairly advantaging the Chinese-owned pork producer WH Group and promoting "Chinese infiltration of American agriculture." In 2024, Waltz received a Congressional Leadership Award from the agricultural policy groups Organization for Competitive Markets and Competitive Markets Action for leading the letter.

==== China ====
Waltz served on the House China Task Force with 15 Republican lawmakers representing 14 committees of jurisdiction to coordinate policy on China. The Task Force collaborated and released the China Task Force report. The CTF issued a final report that includes 82 key findings and more than 400 forward-leaning recommendations for addressing the China threat.

In the 116th Congress, Waltz sponsored the American Critical Mineral Exploration and Innovation Act of 2020 to reduce America's dependence on foreign sources of critical minerals and bring the U.S. supply chain from China back to America by establishing a critical mineral research and development program in the Department of Energy. The bill was signed into law in Section 7002 of Division Z in the FY21 appropriations bill.

Waltz initiated legislation to secure American universities and academies from Chinese espionage, saying that although not all Chinese students in the United States are "spies or bad people", they "have no choice but to provide the Chinese government with whatever information that government demands". In 2020, he secured legislation that provides a universal requirement for researchers from all agencies to disclose all foreign funding sources in applications for federal funding. Failure results in permanent termination of research and development awards to the professor or school, permanent debarment of malign professors, and criminal charges. Further, Waltz directed the Department of Defense to track foreign talent recruitment programs that pose a threat to the United States, particularly as a response to Chinese Communist Party efforts to infiltrate American universities.

Waltz also sponsored legislation to ensure the federal Thrift Savings Plan (TSP) does not invest in Chinese or Russian markets. Weeks later, President Trump directed the Federal Retirement Thrift Investment Board to reverse their decision to expand TSP investments.

==== Foreign policy ====
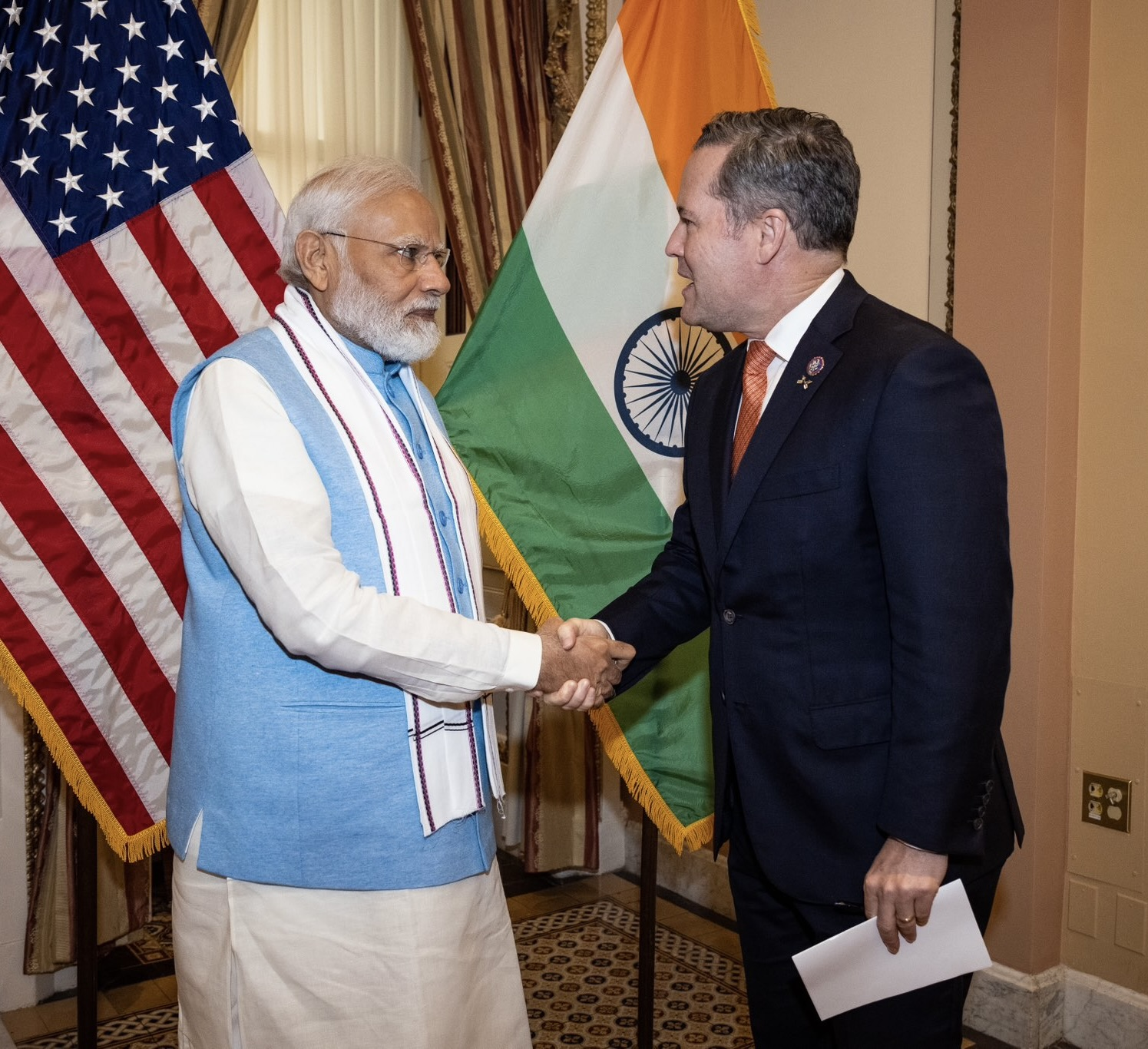
Waltz with Indian prime minister Narendra Modi, 2023

Along with a majority of Democrats, Waltz voted for preliminary versions of the National Defense Authorization Act (NDAA) of 2021, which would prevent the president from withdrawing soldiers from Afghanistan without congressional approval. He voted with Democrats again to override President Trump's veto in late December 2020.

In 2010, Waltz helped found the analytics and training company Metis Solutions. It was bought in November 2020 by Pacific Architects and Engineers for $92 million. As a result of PAE acquiring Metis, Waltz had personally realized capital gains in the range of $5-25 million, according to disclosure releases.

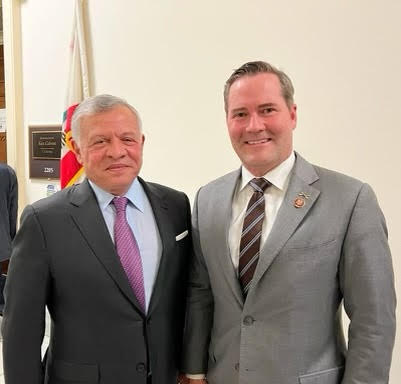
Waltz with King Abdullah II of Jordan at the U.S. Capitol in February 2023

In 2024, he voted against multiple bills to provide aid to Ukraine.

In January 2023, Waltz introduced a bill to seek authorization to use US military force against Mexican drug cartels.

Waltz co-chaired the House Congressional Caucus on India and Indian-Americans. He and Ro Khanna led a congressional delegation to India in August 2023.

Waltz was critical of the Biden administration’s withdrawal from Afghanistan in 2021.

==== Draft ====
Waltz voted to include provisions for making women register with the Selective Service in the NDAA of 2022.

==== Immigration ====
Waltz voted for the Consolidated Appropriations Act (H.R. 1158), which effectively prohibits Immigration and Customs Enforcement from cooperating with the Department of Health and Human Services to detain or remove illegal alien sponsors of Unaccompanied Alien Children.

==== LGBT rights ====
On July 19, 2022, Waltz and 46 other Republican representatives voted for the Respect for Marriage Act, which codified the right to same-sex marriage in federal law.

==== 2024 presidential election ====
Waltz endorsed Donald Trump for the 2024 Republican Party presidential primaries.

==== Fiscal Responsibility Act of 2023 ====
Waltz was among the 71 Republicans who voted against final passage of the Fiscal Responsibility Act of 2023 in the House.

=== Committee assignments ===
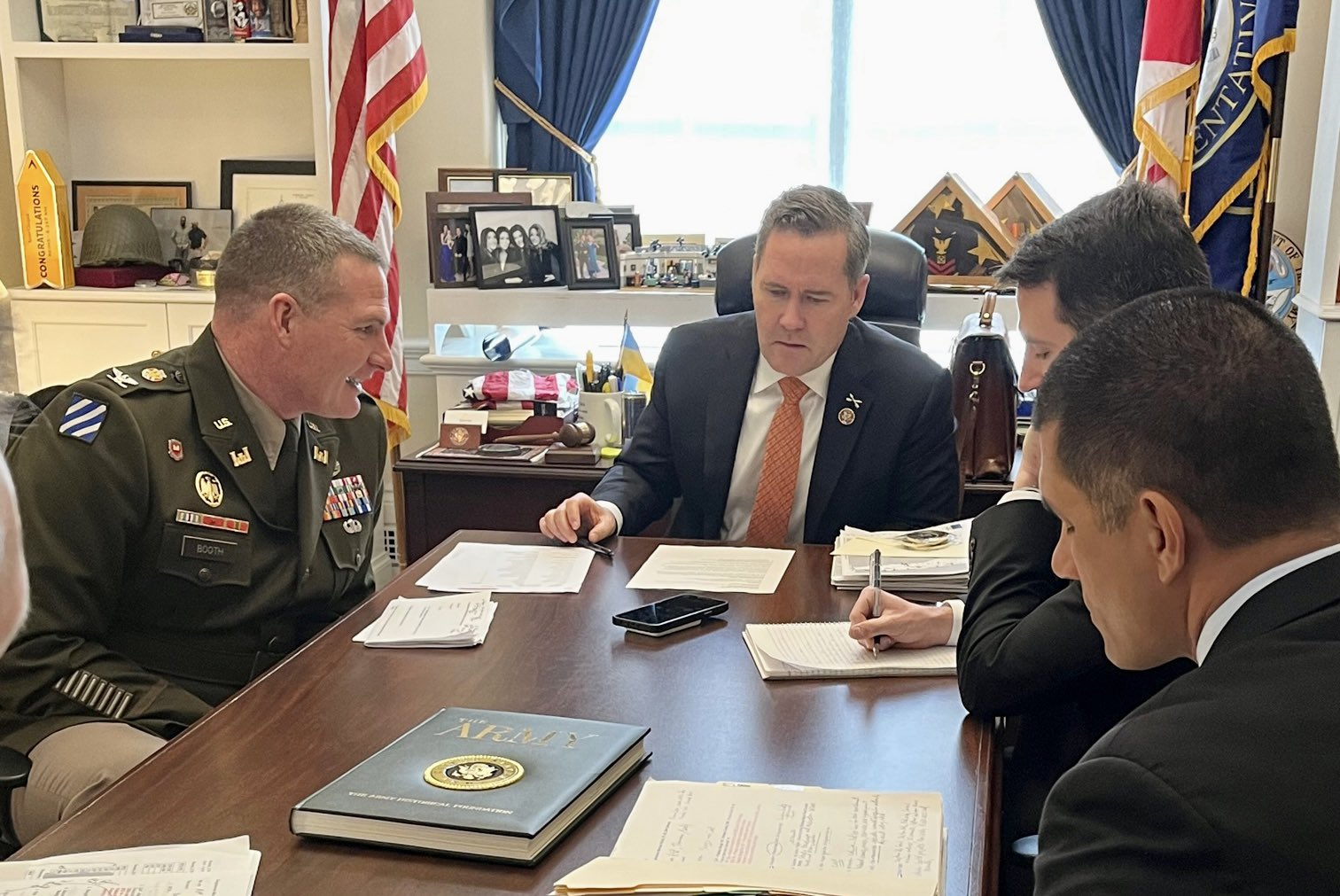
Waltz with the Army Corps of Engineers discussing disaster relief

For the 118th Congress:

- Committee on Armed Services
  - Subcommittee on Military Personnel
  - Subcommittee on Readiness (Chairman)
  - Subcommittee on Strategic Forces
- Committee on Foreign Affairs
  - Subcommittee on the Indo-Pacific
  - Subcommittee on Oversight and Accountability
- United States House Committee on Oversight and Accountability
  - United States House Oversight Subcommittee on Economic Growth, Energy Policy, and Regulatory Affairs
- Permanent Select Committee on Intelligence
  - Subcommittee on Central Intelligence Agency
  - Subcommittee on National Security Agency and Cyber

=== Caucus memberships ===
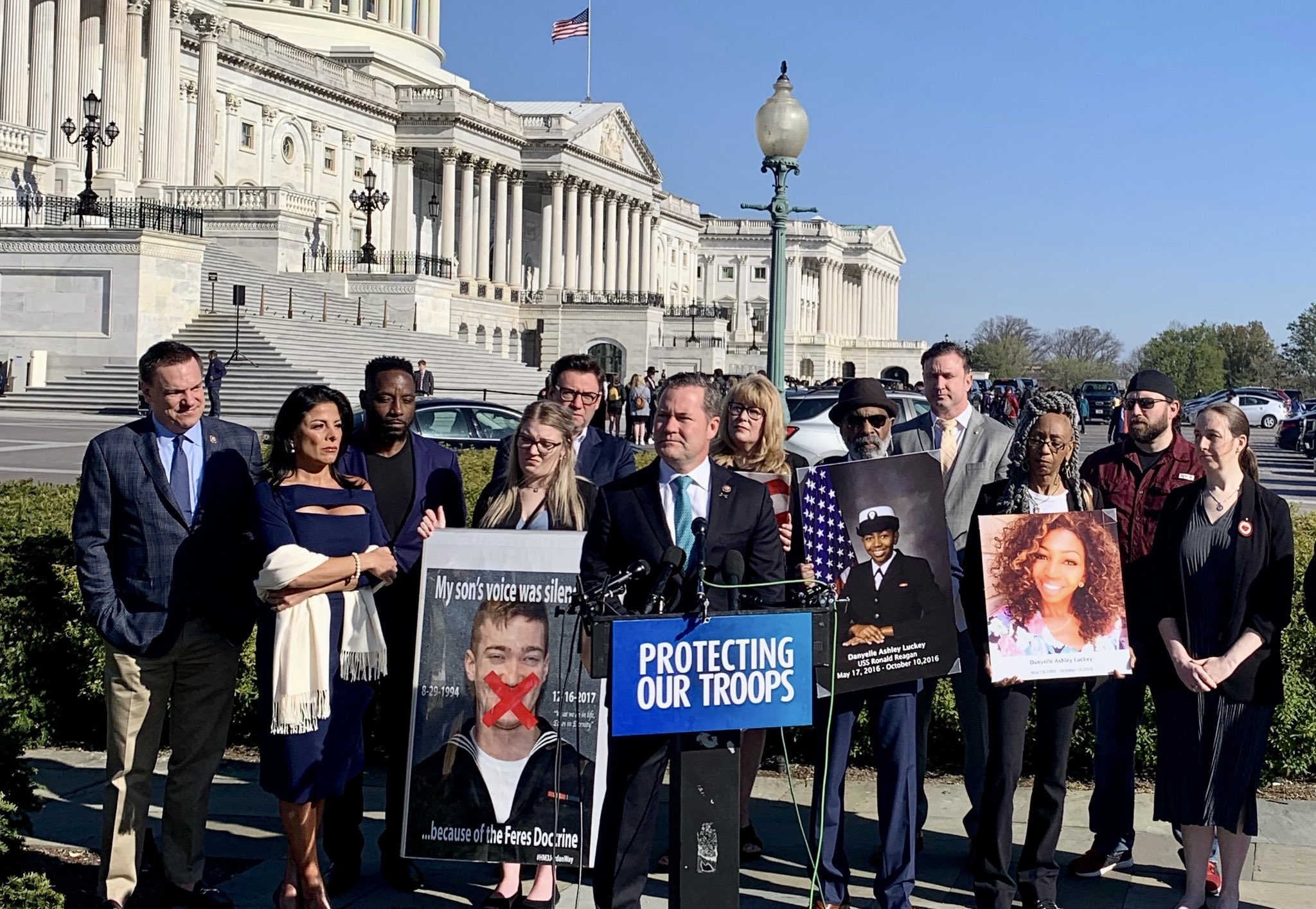
Michael Waltz press conference on DOD medical malpractice

Waltz was a member of the following Congressional caucuses:

- Congressional Afghan Caucus
- American Flood Coalition
- Army Caucus
- Florida Ports Caucus
- For Country Caucus (vice chair and co-founder)
- Kurdish American Caucus
- Congressional Automotive Performance and Motorsports Caucus
- Republican Study Committee
- House Special Operations Forces (SOF) Caucus (co-chair)
- Congressional Shipbuilding Caucus
- Congressional Singapore Caucus
- Congressional Taiwan Caucus
- Republican Main Street Partnership
- Women, Peace and Security (WPS) Caucus
- Congressional Blockchain Caucus

== National Security Advisor (January−May 2025) ==
=== Tenure at the NSA ===
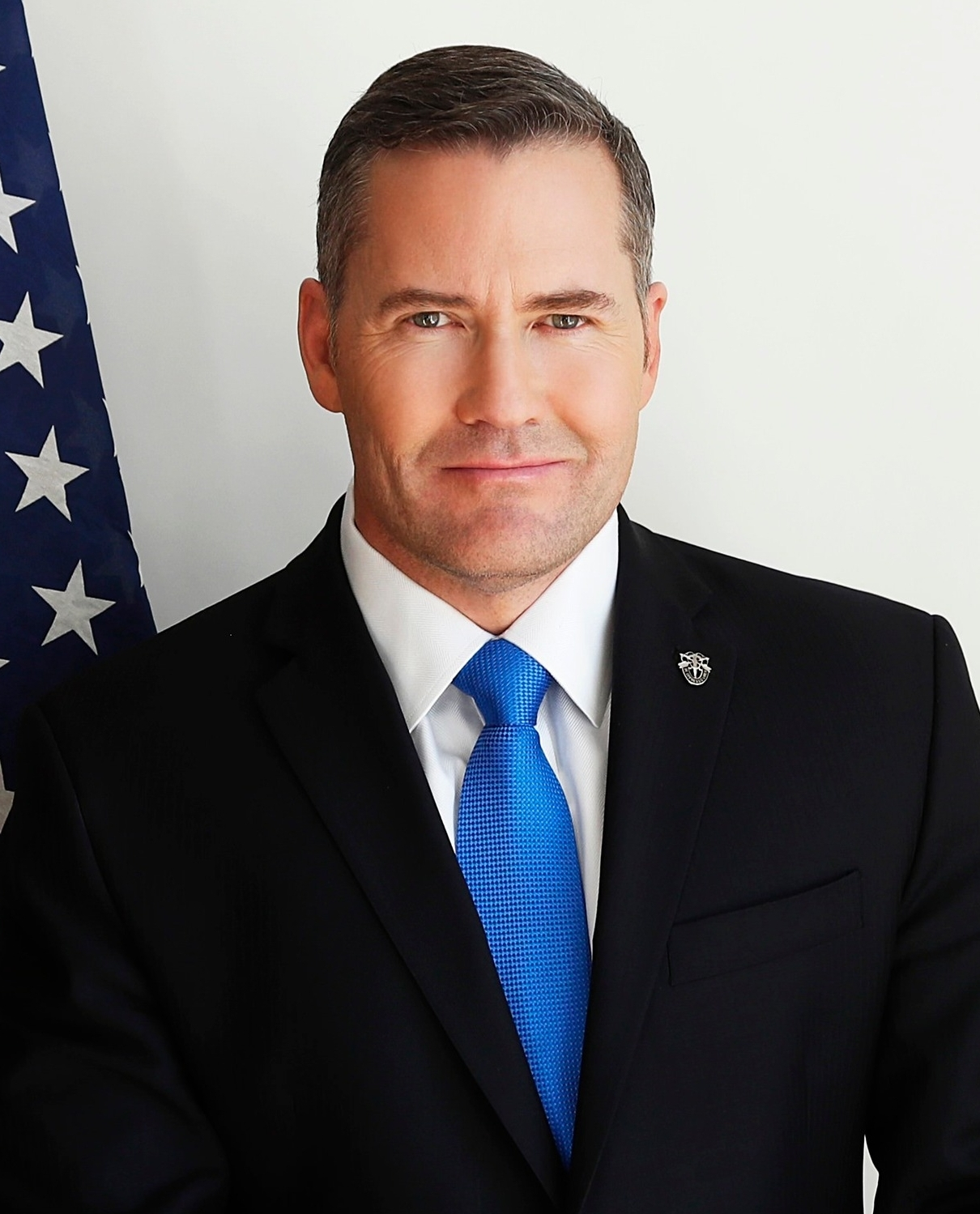
Official portrait of Waltz as National Security Advisor in 2025

On November 12, 2024, President-elect Donald Trump announced that he would appoint Waltz to serve as his national security advisor.

On January 18, 2025, Waltz met with the families of American-Israeli hostages held by Hamas and pressed for full implementation of the Gaza ceasefire and hostage-release deal.

On January 20, 2025, Waltz tendered his resignation from the U.S. House of Representatives in order to take up his appointment with the Trump administration. He would assume office the same day. Shortly after becoming National Security Advisor, Waltz publicly echoed Trump’s position on TikTok, reversing his previous stance supporting a ban in the United States.

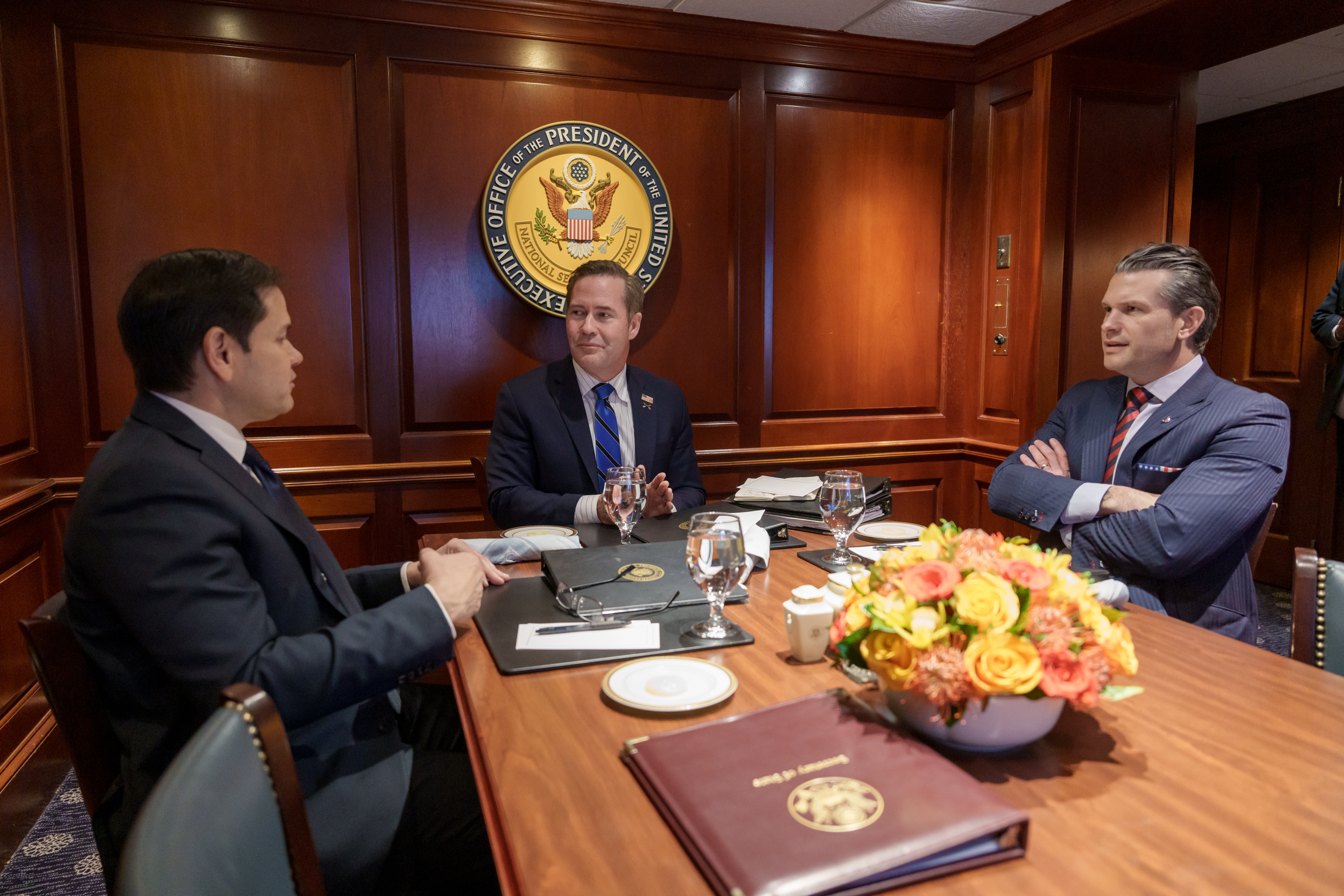
Waltz meeting with Marco Rubio and Pete Hegseth, January 28, 2025

On January 28, 2025, Waltz held a meeting attended by Secretary of State Marco Rubio and Secretary of Defense Pete Hegseth to "discuss implementing President Trump's vision of securing the nation and prioritizing American interests on both domestic and international fronts."

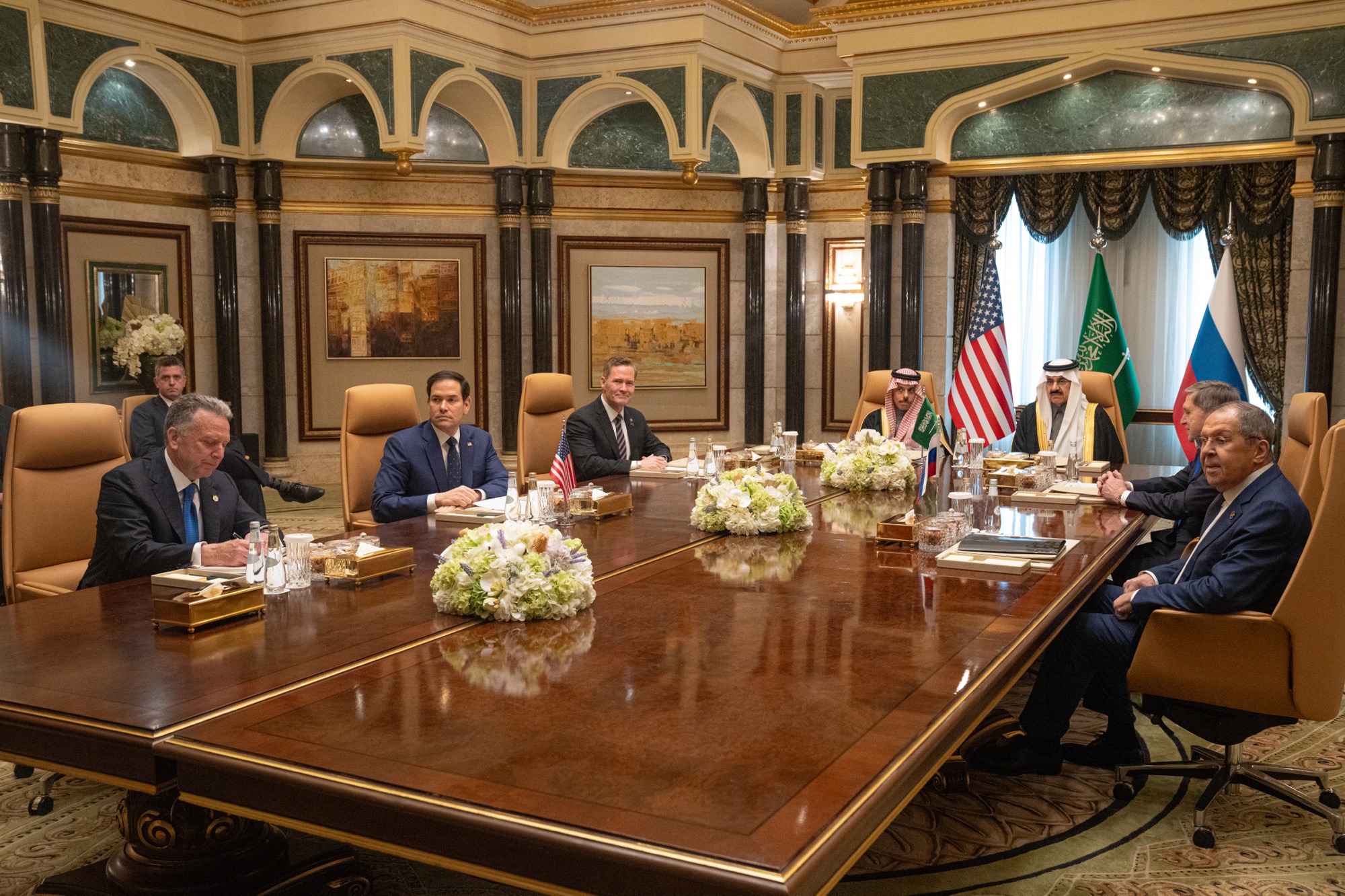
U.S., Saudi, and Russian officials meeting in Riyadh, February 18, 2025

On February 18, 2025, American and Russian delegations, headed by Secretary of State Marco Rubio and Russian foreign minister Sergey Lavrov, respectively, met in Riyadh, Saudi Arabia, in order to develop a framework for further peace negotiations on the war in Ukraine. Rubio was accompanied by Michael Waltz and Special Envoy Steve Witkoff.

On March 3, 2025, Waltz confirmed on CNN's State of the Union that the United States would continue offensive cyber operations against Russia.

On March 24, 2025, Waltz announced a visit to Greenland, which was criticized by Greenlandic leaders as an aggressive move amid ongoing tensions over U.S. interests in the territory. The Greenland government has accused the United States of foreign interference in its affairs.

==== Signal app group chat leak ====
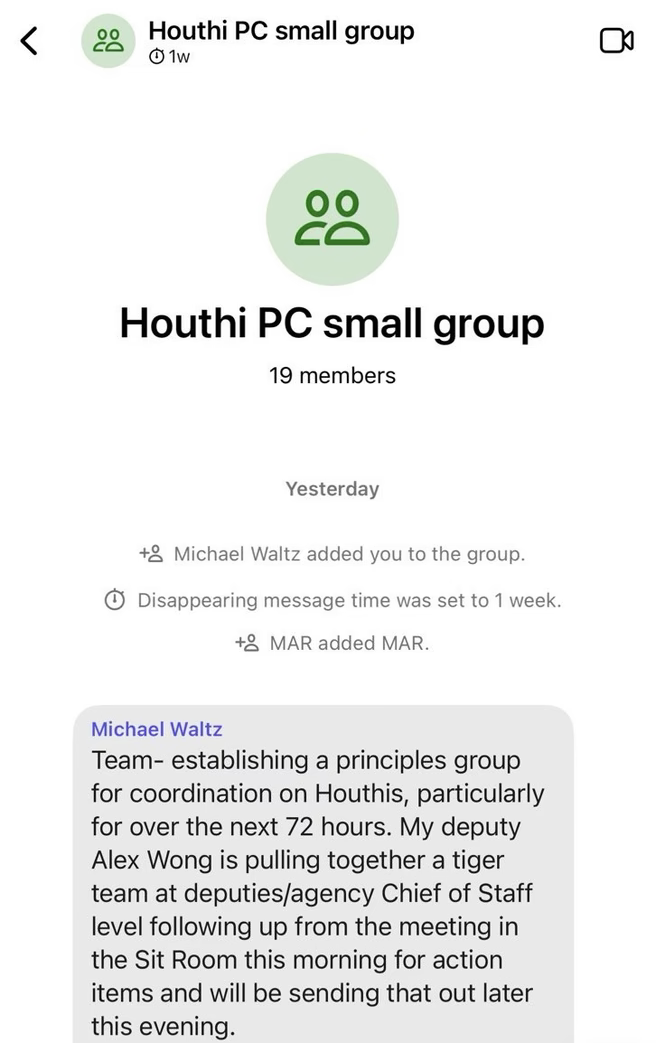
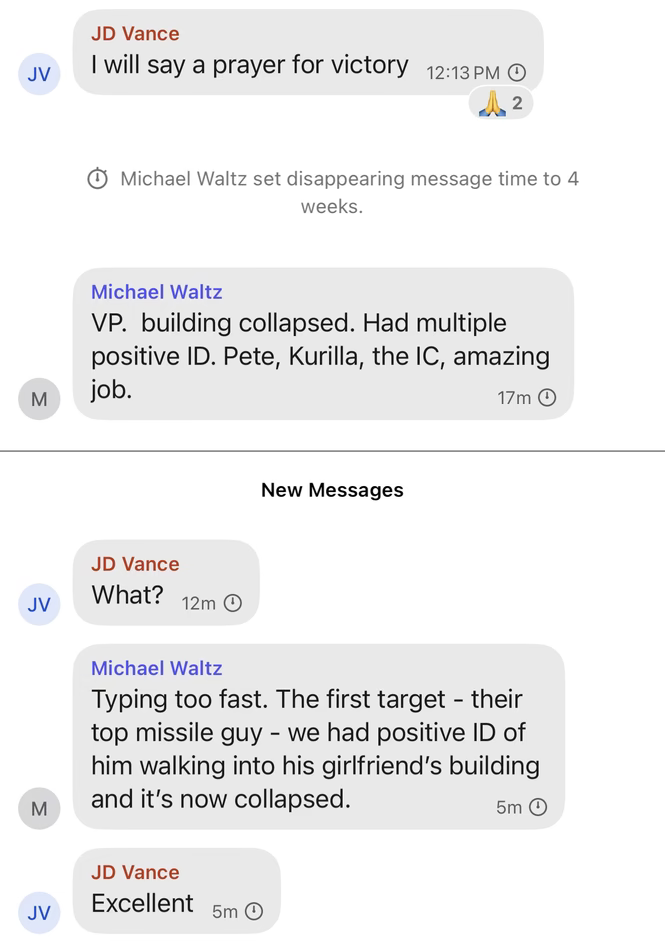
Screenshots from the leaked chat showing "Michael Waltz" discussing the March 2025 United States attacks in Yemen

On March 26, 2025, it was revealed by The Atlantic editor-in-chief Jeffrey Goldberg that Waltz had inadvertently added him to a Signal group chat discussing the upcoming US strikes in Yemen targeting Houthi militia before they were publicly known. Signal is a commercial non-government messaging application. In the Signal chat, Waltz appears to initially add a setting that causes the chat messages to be deleted after one week, but later Waltz changes the setting to let the message deletions occur after four weeks. After the strikes occurred, Waltz provided a real-time update to the Signal chat, announcing that the strikes' "first target", which was the Houthi's "top missile guy – we had positive ID of him walking into his girlfriend's building and it's now collapsed".

After The Atlantic reported about the Signal chat, the incident sparked national security concerns as Pentagon regulations specifically prohibit the use of Signal and similar messaging apps for sharing classified information. Due to the automatic message deletion setting, there were also concerns on whether the conversations were kept on official record as mandated by the Presidential Records Act. Waltz responded to the reporting by saying that Goldberg "really is the bottom scum of journalists … I don't text him. He wasn't on my phone", but Goldberg "somehow gets on somebody's contact and then get sucked into this group"; Waltz also said of Goldberg: "I didn't see this loser in the group. It looked like someone else", raising the possibility that Goldberg "did it deliberately". Waltz told the media that "I take full responsibility. I built the group", then said: "We made a mistake. We're moving forward".

After the Signal leak, Der Spiegel searched the Internet using a commercial information provider, a commercial people search engine, and leaked databases, which revealed Waltz's personal mobile number, personal email address and its passwords, and Waltz's personal profiles for Microsoft Teams, LinkedIn, WhatsApp and Signal.

On March 30, 2025, The Wall Street Journal reported that according to American officials, Waltz had started and hosted multiple other Signal group chats containing Cabinet members to discuss sensitive issues related to national security, including on military operations and on ceasing hostilities between Ukraine and Russia. In April, The Washington Post reported that officials had stated that Waltz received government communications on his personal Gmail account, including his schedule and work documents, and that Waltz would then transfer data from his schedule to Signal. Both The Wall Street Journal and The Washington Post quoted their sources as indicating that Trump did not want to fire Waltz because it would make a left-leaning media outlet (The Atlantic) look good, and that Waltz would have been fired if it was a right-leaning media outlet that exposed him.

Politico followed with an April 2, 2025, report that reported that Waltz's national security team had created at least 20 Signal group chats discussing official (and sometimes sensitive) national security issues, on topics such as Ukraine, China, Gaza, Africa, Europe and the Middle East. Politico wrote that its sources were four people who had been added to such Signal chats, one of whom said: "Waltz built the entire NSC communications process on Signal", while another said that Waltz and his national security team had continued to use Signal ever since the transition period before Trump's second presidency began.

==== Dismissal ====
On May 1, 2025, it was reported that Mike Waltz and his deputy, Alex Nelson Wong, would leave their respective posts. Waltz was announced as the nominee for United States Ambassador to the United Nations on the same day.

On May 3, 2025, it was reported that Waltz and Israeli Prime Minister Benjamin Netanyahu had held discussions in March 2025 about a potential strike on Iran. These discussions happened without Trump's knowledge, before a state visit by Netanyahu. Trump was reportedly angered that Waltz was attempting to push U.S. policy in a direction Trump was not comfortable with, and the meetings possibly contributed to Waltz's firing. However, the administration would later proceed with strikes on Iran through Operation Midnight Hammer.

== Ambassador to the United Nations (2025–present) ==
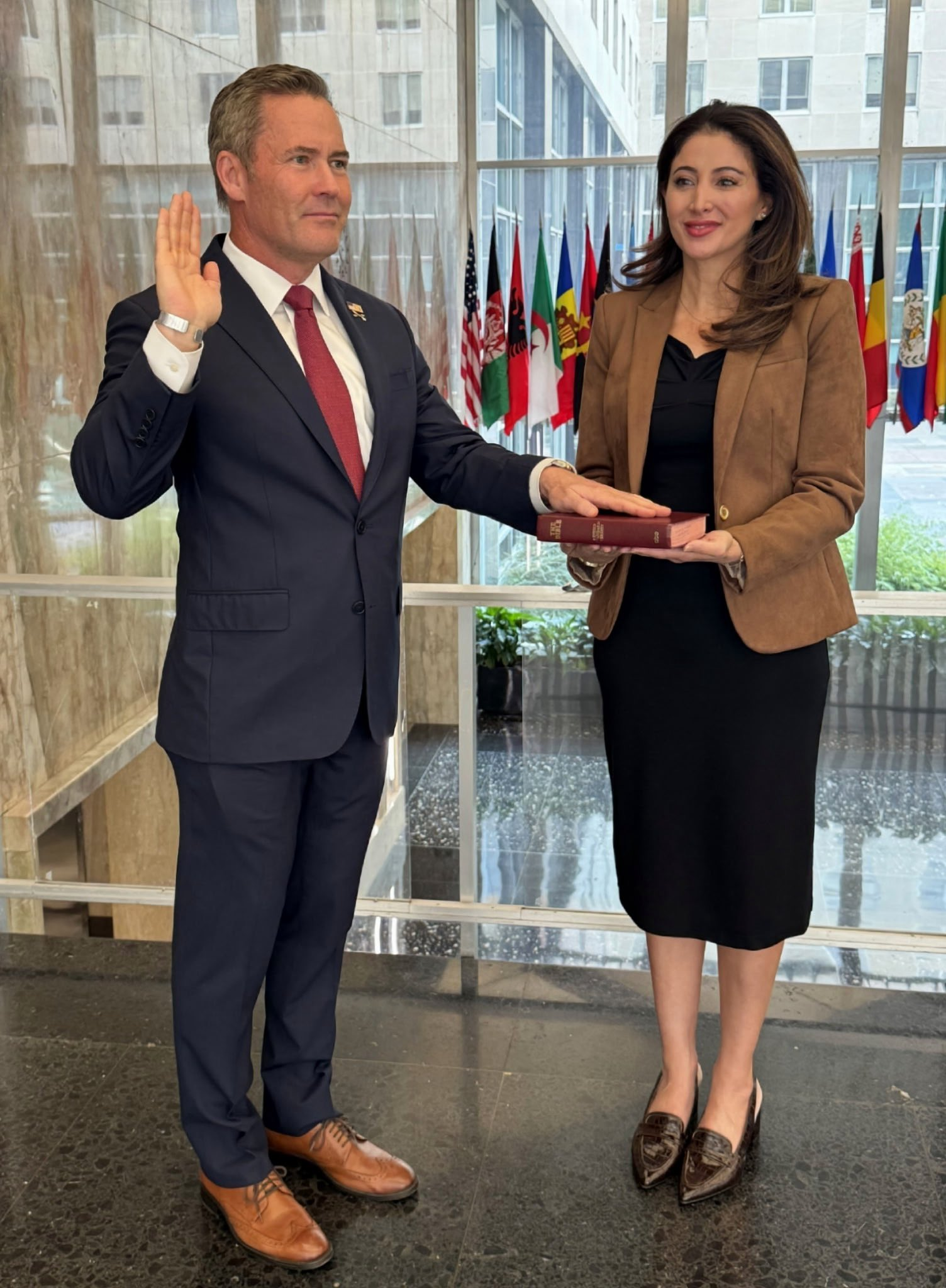
Waltz sworn in as UN ambassador with his wife, Julia, holding the Bible at the State Department

On May 1, 2025, President Trump nominated Waltz to serve as the next United States Ambassador to the United Nations. During his confirmation hearing by the Senate Foreign Relations Committee, Senator Rand Paul attempted to delay the vote, but Democratic senator Jeanne Shaheen voted alongside Senate Republicans to advance Waltz to a full floor vote. In the committee hearing, Waltz promised to "Make the UN Great Again."

On July 24, 2025, the committee approved of Waltz's nomination by a 12–10 vote for a full Senate confirmation vote. On September 19, 2025, he was confirmed for the office in a 47–43 vote by the U.S. Senate and was sworn in the following day. Waltz took office after presenting his credentials to Secretary-General António Guterres on September 21, 2025. On September 29, 2025, Waltz was also confirmed by the Senate as the United States representative to the United Nations General Assembly.

In October 2025, Waltz condemned the Venezuelan government under Nicolás Maduro, calling him an "illegitimate leader, convicted in the Southern District of New York".

In November 2025, Waltz helped secure passage of a United States-backed resolution to authorize an international stabilization force in Gaza. He called the resolution "historic and constructive", which included overseeing the borders for demilitarization, safety and security, as well as authorizing a Board of Peace to coordinate the redevelopment of Gaza. Waltz partnered with Nicki Minaj that same month for a panel discussion titled "Combatting Religious Violence and the Killing of Christians in Nigeria" at the United States Mission to the United Nations. This panel occurred after she thanked Trump for his administration's designation of Nigeria as a "country of particular concern" for religious freedom violations.

On January 15, 2026, Waltz addressed the UN Security Council to express his strong support for the demonstrators involved in the 2025–2026 Iranian protests. He warned that all options, including military action, remain available to stop what he described as the "slaughter" of protesters. On March 11, 2026, Waltz said that Iran's strikes on other Gulf nations during the 2026 Iran war will unite countries against Iran and will ultimately backfire on them.

== Political positions ==
Waltz has been described as a neoconservative in the Bush–Cheney tradition.

=== War in Afghanistan ===
In a 2017 interview with The National Interest, Waltz described his views on Afghanistan as primarily oriented around ideological objectives, rather than material objectives. He assessed that Afghanistan could be won through slow cultural conversion by unconventional forces, described as "multiple generations of winning hearts and minds", and anticipated 100 years before such objectives could be achieved, saying:

We are in a war of ideas and we are fighting an ideology. It is easy to bomb a tank, but incredibly difficult to bomb an idea. We need a long-term strategy that discredits the ideology of Islamic extremism ... We are in a multi-decade war and we are only 15 years in.

He reiterated his views at CPAC 2017 as well as an anecdote about his time serving in Afghanistan during the public announcement of the Obama-era troop withdrawals.

In August 2021, during the final stages of the second US withdrawal from Afghanistan, Waltz called on President Biden to reverse course on the war in Afghanistan, urging for the redeployment of special forces on the ground and the use of aerial bombardment of Taliban positions by the US Air Force. In an op-ed for Fox News, he predicted that a return to Afghanistan was inevitable, and viewed withdrawal as a temporary act that would "decimate" local allies and civilians, saying "thousands will die".

==== Veterans ====
Waltz voted against the Honoring our PACT Act of 2022 which expanded VA benefits to veterans exposed to toxic chemicals during their military service.

=== Canada ===
In 2024, Waltz published a video on X expressing support for Canadian opposition leader Pierre Poilievre, who he said was going to send Canadian prime minister Justin Trudeau "packing in 2025 (finally) and start digging Canada out of the progressive mess it's in". He has frequently criticized Trudeau for not being sufficiently tough on China, criticizing Trudeau for abstaining on a Parliament vote on declaring the persecution of Uyghurs in China as a genocide, allowing the sale of a lithium mine to a Chinese-state owned entity and the pledging of Chinese donors to donate $1 million to the Pierre Elliott Trudeau Foundation, and warned about Chinese government interference in Canadian elections. When asked by Kristen Welker if Donald Trump is serious about annexing Canada, Waltz deflected: "I think the Canadian people would—many of them would—love to join the United States with no tariffs, with lower taxes."

=== China ===
Waltz is considered one of Congress's most hawkish members with regard to China, saying, "We are in a Cold War with the Chinese Communist Party." In 2021, he was the first member of Congress to call for a full U.S. boycott of the 2022 Winter Olympics in Beijing over what he described as the CCP's genocide and internment of Chinese Uyghur populations and the enslavement, forced labor, and re-education camps of ethnic minorities in China, likening the 2022 Olympics to the 1936 Summer Olympics held in Nazi Germany. In 2024, he called China an "existential threat to the US with the most rapid military build-up since the 1930s", and supported significant investments in the US Navy. In a 2024 The Economist op-ed written together with Matthew Kroenig, Waltz argued for winding down conflicts in the Middle East and Ukraine to free up military assets needed to confront China.

=== Russia and Ukraine ===
While initially backing Ukraine following the launch of the Russian invasion in February 2022, he indicated that his views have evolved to a less supportive position in 2024. In 2024, he suggested that Trump could threaten to damage the Russian economy by lowering the price of oil and gas, using it as a leverage. In an op-ed to The Economist, Waltz said giving military aid to Ukraine indefinitely is a "recipe for failure", but that the US can "provide more weapons to Ukraine with fewer restrictions" if Russian president Vladimir Putin refuses to engage in peace talks. He repeatedly criticized the Biden administration's strategy in Ukraine as unclear and confusing, and expressed support for a negotiated settlement of the conflict.

=== Iran ===
Waltz attracted international scrutiny in April 2026 after stating at the United Nations that potential U.S. strikes on Iranian civilian infrastructure, such as specifically bridges and power plants, would not constitute war crimes. He dismissed such concerns as a "false, fake and ridiculous notion," arguing that because these facilities are often operated by the Islamic Revolutionary Guard Corps (IRGC), they represent "legitimate military targets." This position was widely criticized by legal experts and human rights advocates, including former Human Rights Watch chief Kenneth Roth and former ICC prosecutor Luis Moreno Ocampo, who maintained that targeting dual-use infrastructure essential to civilian life violates international humanitarian law.

A staunch proponent of "maximum pressure," Waltz has consistently advocated for a naval blockade and additional sanctions to force Iranian concessions. During a 2026 interview with CBS, he expressed confidence that the Iranian government would eventually abandon what he described as their "obsession with having a nuclear weapon," despite Tehran's official stance that its nuclear program is entirely peaceful. He supported the continued deployment of U.S. Marines to board and seize Iranian-flagged vessels in the Sea of Oman, characterizing these actions as necessary enforcement measures, even as Iranian military officials labeled the seizures "armed piracy" and a violation of existing ceasefires.

In April 2026, during a cease fire, Waltz has also been a vocal critic of Iranian efforts to legislate control over the Strait of Hormuz. When Iranian lawmakers introduced a bill to enshrine their "inalienable right" to decide passage through the Strait based on national security and environmental factors, Waltz maintained that the U.S. must ensure the waterway remains open to international commerce. He argued that the IRGC's influence over maritime safety and national security in the region posed a direct threat to global stability, asserting that the U.S. military would continue to move forward with operations like "Epic Fury" to achieve its diplomatic and strategic objectives.

== Electoral history ==
Florida's 6th congressional district Republican primary, 2018
Party	Candidate	Votes	%
Republican	Michael Waltz	32,833	42.4
Republican	John Ward	23,543	30.4
Republican	Fred Costello	21,023	27.2
Total votes		77,399	100.0

Florida's 6th congressional district, 2018
Party	Candidate	Votes	%
Republican	Michael Waltz	187,891	56.3
Democratic	Nancy Soderberg	145,758	43.7
Total votes		333,649	100.0
Republican hold			

Florida's 6th congressional district, 2020
Party	Candidate	Votes	%
Republican	Michael Waltz (incumbent)	265,393	60.6
Democratic	Clint Curtis	172,305	39.4
n/a	Write-ins	158	<0.1
Total votes		437,856	100.0
Republican hold			

Florida's 6th congressional district, 2022
Party	Candidate	Votes	%
Republican	Michael Waltz (incumbent)	226,548	75.3
Libertarian	Joe Hannoush	74,207	24.7
Total votes		300,755	100.0
Republican hold			

2024 Florida's 6th congressional district Republican primary
Party	Candidate	Votes	%
Republican	Michael Waltz (incumbent)	65,234	82.0
Republican	John Grow	14,280	19.0
Total votes		79,514	100.00

2024 Florida's 6th congressional district election
Party	Candidate	Votes	%
Republican	Michael Waltz (incumbent)	284,414	66.5
Democratic	James Stockton	143,050	33.5
Total votes		427,464	100.00
Republican hold			

== Personal life ==
Waltz is married to Julia Nesheiwat, an Army veteran who served in the Bush, Obama, and Trump administrations, most recently as Trump's homeland security advisor. Waltz and Nesheiwat have a son together. Waltz also has a daughter from a prior marriage.

== Media appearances ==
=== Books ===
In 2014, his book Warrior Diplomat: A Green Beret's Battles from Washington to Afghanistan was published. In 2022, he wrote the book Dawn of the Brave, a colorful, animal-filled Christian children's book about service. In 2024, his book Hard Truths: Think and Lead Like a Green Beret was published.

== Awards and decorations ==
Waltz's awards and decorations include:

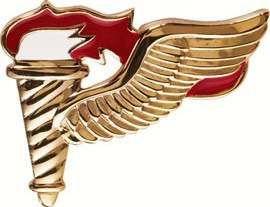

Combat Infantryman Badge
Basic Parachutist Badge
Legion of Merit	Bronze Star Medal with Combat "V" device and three bronze oak leaf clusters	Meritorious Service Medal
Army Commendation Medal with two bronze oak leaf clusters	Army Achievement Medal	Army Reserve Components Achievement Medal
National Defense Service Medal	Armed Forces Expeditionary Medal	Afghanistan Campaign Medal with two bronze service stars
Global War on Terrorism Service Medal	Armed Forces Reserve Medal with "M" device for mobilization and "3" Numeral Device indicating three mobilizations	Army Service Medal
Army Overseas Service Ribbon with bronze service star	Army Reserve Components Overseas Training Ribbon with numeral 2	NATO Medal
Pathfinder Badge
Special Forces Tab
Ranger Tab

U.S. House of Representatives
Preceded by Ron DeSantis	Member of the U.S. House of Representatives from Florida's 6th congressional district 2019–2025	Succeeded by Randy Fine
Political offices
Preceded by Jake Sullivan	United States National Security Advisor; 2025	Succeeded by Marco Rubio
Diplomatic posts
Preceded by Linda Thomas-Greenfield	United States Ambassador to the United Nations; 2025–present	Incumbent
U.S. order of precedence (ceremonial)
Preceded by Jamieson Greer as United States Trade Representative	Order of precedence of the United States as Ambassador of the United States to the United Nations	Succeeded by Kelly Loeffler as Administrator of the Small Business Administration
