= Montreal International Games Summit =

Conference on video games

The Montreal International Games Summit (MIGS), also known as Le Sommet International du jeu de Montréal (SIJM), is a conference on video games. The first summit was held in 2004 and it usually takes place in November at Le Palais des Congrès de Montreal in Canada. Its mission is to expand the exposure of the video game community in Quebec, and to improve the Quebec video game industry. MIGS is currently the leading professional gaming summit of the East Coast. The overall aim of MIGS is to promote, train, network, and hire potential developers in the gaming industry. Professionals attending the summit partake in lectures and presentations largely oriented around how to improve specific aspects of the industry, such as art, VFX, and design. Currently, MIGS has partnered with many of the leading electronic and game development companies in Canada, including Ubisoft and Warner Bros. Games. The Montreal International Gaming Summit is networked similarly to the Electronic Entertainment Expo, using the same application to facilitate interaction between industry players and associates. In 2008 MIGS became an event that was open to the public. 2013 marked the tenth annual Montreal International Gaming Summit.

== Events ==
=== Business Lounge ===
The Business Lounge is designed to establish collaboration and finalize ideas by key decision makers in the industry. It is located away from the summit itself, as only professional members of the industry may attend. Most corporate figures that attend the summit also make appearances at the business lounge, as it is a hub for most corporate decisions at the summit. Attendees at the lounge may also attend exclusive cocktail events, where they may interact with other corporate figures and keynotes speakers at the summit.

==== Online Meeting Application ====
The Online Meeting Application is an application that is utilized at the Electronic Entertainment Expo (E3). This application is used to book meetings with summit attendees. The application was developed by Game Connection, and allows attendees to contact industry figures directly, manage scheduling, and promote themselves as players in the industry.

=== Expo Zone ===
The Expo Zone is where all presentations and showcases for new products are displayed. Video game artists also feature their work in the Expo Zone. Most readily available attractions at MIGS are available in the Expo Zone. It is also possible for attendees to book places in order to promote themselves and their products. The Expo Zone is the most readily available attraction for general interest attendees who are not part of the professional industry. Since MIGS opened to the public in 2008, the Expo Zone has become the primary attraction for the general public.

=== 2012 ===
MIGS 2012 was held on November 13 and November 14 at the Hilton Montreal Bonaventure. The theme for the year's event was "The Future. Unknown," and was focused on upcoming trends in the video game industry as well as new technologies and breakthroughs that could impact the future of video game development. The opening keynote was presented by Tim Sweeney, founder of Epic Games, on some of the current technologies used in games. The second day's opening keynote was presented by Peter Molyneux, currently the CEO and founder of 22cans with a talk about game design. The event was closed out by a "Brain Dump" session with various industry professionals.

== Partners ==
The following is a list of the current partners and sponsors of the MIGS

- China Cultural Industry Association (Guest Country)
- BlackBerry (Silver Partner)
- Ludia (Bronze Partner)
- Investissement Quebec (VIP Cocktail Partner)
- Fasken Martineau (Business Lounge Partner)
- espresso-jobs.com (Career Fair Partner)
- Warner Bros. Games Montreal (Photo Booth Partner)
- 3vis (Battle of the Studios Partner)
- Auto desk (Battle of the Studios Partner)
- Wacom (Battle of the Studios Partner)
- Eidos Montreal (Coffee Breaks Partner)
- Square Enix (Coffee Breaks Partner)
- Arches Partner (Ubisoft)
