= Jan Guenther Braun =

Canadian writer

Jan Guenther Braun is a Canadian writer from Osler, Saskatchewan. Braun is best known for her 2008 novel Somewhere Else, which is considered an important early work of Queer Mennonite literature. She has also published poetry and literary criticism

Braun lived in Winnipeg, Manitoba for many years, where she received a degree in theology at Canadian Mennonite University. She currently works at the University of Toronto in Toronto, Ontario.
