= House China Task Force =

The House China Task Force is a group in the United States House of Representatives that is focused on China. The House China Task Force is chaired by U.S. Rep. Michael McCaul (TX-10).

The pillars of the House China Task Force are: National Security, Technology, Economics and Energy, Competitiveness, and Ideological Competition. Each member of the Task Force serve on two pillars as a co-chair.

Incoming national security advisor Michael Waltz serves on the House China Task Force, along with 15 Republican lawmakers representing 14 committees of jurisdiction to coordinate policy on China.

The China Task Force report includes 82 key findings and 430 recommendations for addressing the China threat.

== Members ==
- Rep. Michael McCaul (R-TX) Chair
- Rep. Andy Barr (R-KY)
- Rep. Neal Dunn (R-FL)
- Rep. Mike Garcia (R-CA)
- Rep. Mark Green (R-TN)
- Rep. Diana Harshbarger (R-TN)
- Rep. Young Kim (R-CA)
- Rep. Darin LaHood (R-IL)
- Rep. Scott Perry (R-PA)
- Rep. Guy Reschenthaler (R-PA)
- Rep. Austin Scott (R-GA)
- Rep. Michael Waltz (R-FL)
- Rep. Rob Wittman (R-VA)

== See also ==
- United States House Select Committee on Strategic Competition between the United States and the Chinese Communist Party
- United States-China Economic and Security Review Commission
- Congressional-Executive Commission on China
- Cox Report
- Inter-Parliamentary Alliance on China
