= W. Stuart Edwards =

William Stuart Edwards, CMG, KC (14 July 1880 – 2 September 1944) was a Canadian civil servant and lawyer. He was Deputy Minister of Justice and Deputy Attorney General of Canada from 1924 to 1941.

== Biography ==
Born in Thurso, Quebec, Edwards studied law with the firm of O'Gara, Wyld and Osler. He was called to the Bar of Ontario in 1909 and practiced with McCarthy, Osler, Hoskin and Harcourt. He joined the Department of Justice in 1910, was promoted to secretary of the department in 1913, and assistant deputy minister in 1915. He was made a Dominion King's Counsel in 1927 and an Ontario KC in 1928.

He became to Deputy Minister of Justice of Canada and Deputy Attorney General in 1924, in succession to Edmund Leslie Newcombe, CMG, KC, who had been appointed as a puisne justice of the Supreme Court of Canada. Edwards retired in 1941 owing to ill health. He was succeeded by F. P. Varcoe. He died in 1944 at Blue Sea Lake, Quebec.

He was a nephew of Senator William Cameron Edwards.
