= William F. Pentney =

Canadian justice

William F. Pentney is a justice with the Federal Court of Canada and an ex officio member of the Federal Court of Appeal. He was appointed in 2017 on June 23. Prior to that he was the Deputy Minister of Justice and Deputy Attorney General of Canada; a post he was appointed to on November 5, 2012. List of deputy ministers of justice (Canada)

Justice Pentney started his career as a professor in the Faculty of Law at the University of Ottawa. He joined the Canadian Public Service 1989 as Special Advisor, Law Reform and Litigation, Canadian Human Rights Commission and then as the General Counsel and Director of Legal Services at the Canadian Human Rights Commission. He worked for the Federal Government from 1999 to 2017 in a number of positions.

He has won the following awards; University of Ottawa, Common Law Silver Medal – 1982 Duff-Rinfret Scholarship – LL.M. – 1983 Canadian Forces Medallion for Distinguished Service – 2010 Queen's Diamond Jubilee Medal – 2012 Awarded federal Queen's Counsel – 2015
