= Osler, Saskatchewan =

Town in Saskatchewan, Canada

Osler
- Town
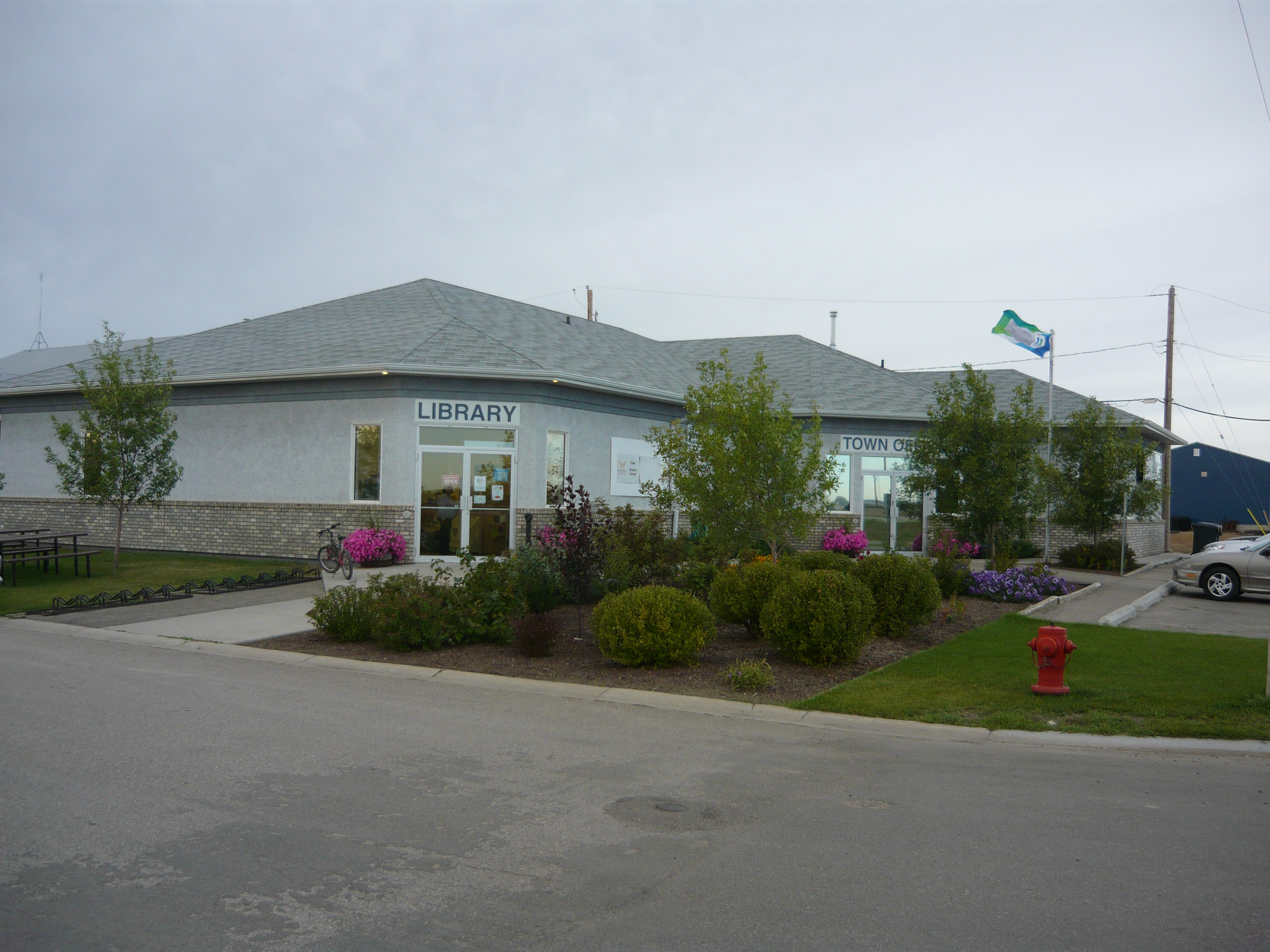
- Library and Town Office

- Location of Osler in Saskatchewan Osler (Saskatchewan)
- Coordinates: 52.37°N 106.54°W
- Country: Canada
- Province: Saskatchewan
- Metropolitan area: Saskatoon
- Rural municipality: Corman Park No. 344
- Post office established: 1891
- Founded: 1892
- Town incorporated: 1985

Government
  - Mayor: Abe Quiring
  - Governing body: Osler Town Council

Area
  - Land: 1.55 km^{2} (0.60 sq mi)

Population (2016)
  - Total: 1,237
  - Density: 796.5/km^{2} (2,063/sq mi)
- Time zone: CST
- Postal code: S0K 3A0
- Area code: 306
- Highways: Highway 11
- Website: Official Site

Osler is a town in the Canadian province of Saskatchewan, founded in the 1890s. The community was named after Sir Edmund Boyd Osler (1845–1924), who was an Ontario-based explorer, railroad financier, and Member of Parliament.

The town has a library, seniors' centre, volunteer fire department, gas station, grocery store, first responders, leisure centre, two schools, and four churches. Osler is about 20 km north of Saskatoon.

== History ==
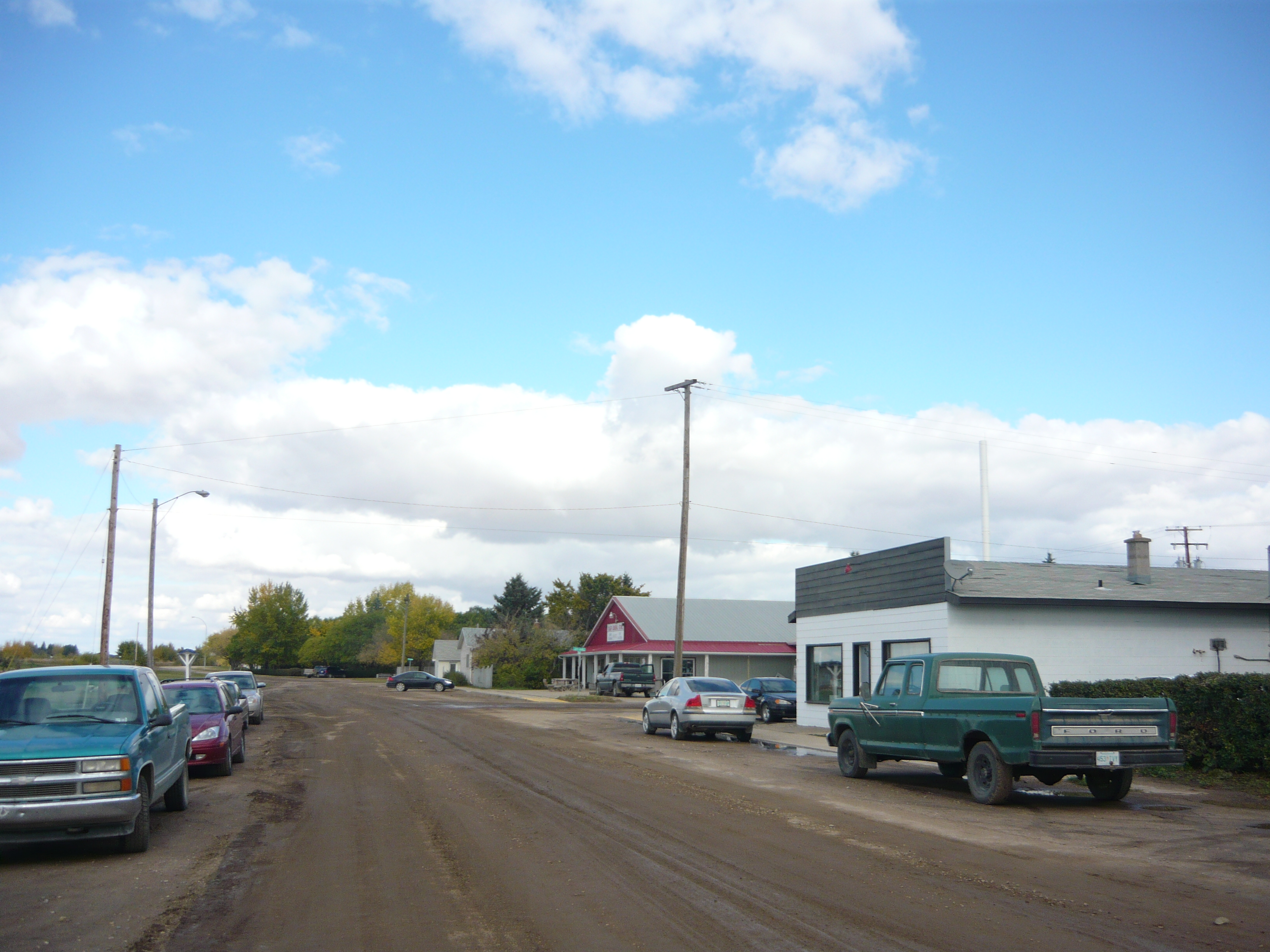
First Street

Osler was built along the historic Qu'Appelle, Long Lake and Saskatchewan Railroad after surveying starting in 1890 by the engineering firm of Osler, Hammond and Nanton.

In 1892 the station house was built. The town of Osler came into existence soon after and became one of many towns and villages to spring up along the new railroad. Osler officially became a village on April 9, 1904, and stayed a village until May 1, 1918, when it became a Hamlet. Then, in 1949 it was upgraded to organized Hamlet status. Osler became a village for a second time in 1968, and was officially designated Town of Osler in 1985.

By the 1970s the railroad station had fallen into disuse and it was demolished by Canadian National Railway in 1973.

== Demographics ==
In the 2021 Census of Population conducted by Statistics Canada, Osler had a population of 1,251 living in 420 of its 429 total private dwellings, a change of 1.1% from its 2016 population of 1,237. With a land area of 1.62 km^{2} (0.63 sq mi), it had a population density of 772.2/km^{2} (2,000.0/sq mi) in 2021.

Canada census – Osler community profile

	2021	2016	2011
Population	1,251 (+1.1% from 2016)	1,237 (13.7% from 2011)	1,088 (17.5% from 2006)
Land area	1.62 km^{2} (0.63 sq mi)	1.55 km^{2} (0.60 sq mi)	1.55 km^{2} (0.60 sq mi)
Population density	771.7/km^{2} (1,999/sq mi)	796.5/km^{2} (2,063/sq mi)	700.6/km^{2} (1,815/sq mi)
Median age	35.6 (M: 35.2, F: 35.6)	33.2 (M: 32.5, F: 33.8)	31.2 (M: 30.1, F: 31.8)
Private dwellings	420 (total)	412 (total)	298 (total)
Median household income

References: 2021 2016 2011

== Notable people ==
- Arnold Boldt, athlete
- David Boldt, politician
- Jan Guenther Braun, author
- Elmer Driedger, lawyer

== See also ==
- List of communities in Saskatchewan
- List of towns in Saskatchewan
