= George Burbidge =

Canadian lawyer, civil servant, judge (1847–1908)

George Wheelock Burbidge

Justice of the Exchequer Court of Canada
- In office October 1, 1887 – February 18, 1908
- Nominated by: John A. Macdonald

Personal details
- Born: February 6, 1847 Cornwallis Township, Nova Scotia
- Died: February 18, 1908 (aged 61) Ottawa, Ontario
- Education: Mount Allison Wesleyan College

George Wheelock Burbidge (6 February 1847 – 18 February 1908) was a Canadian lawyer, judge and author. After being called to the bar of New Brunswick in 1872, he became a partner in the Saint John, New Brunswick law firm of Harrison and Burbidge.

In 1882, Burbidge was appointed federal Deputy Minister of Justice. He is noted for having conducted the prosecution of Louis Riel during his trial for treason following the North-West Rebellion of 1885.

In October 1887, he subsequently became the first justice of the Exchequer Court, the predecessor to the modern Federal Court of Canada. Two of his rulings that are considered especially important

- Samson v. The Queen, (1888) 2 Ex. C.R. 30 (concerning the value of land expropriated by the Crown)
- St. John Gas Light Co. v. The Queen, (1895) 4 Ex. C. R. 326 (one of the first judicial pronouncements on environmental pollution)

Burbidge was also active in community affairs. Elected president of the Associated Charities of Ottawa in 1895, he helped found the Victorian Order of Nurses in 1897 and succeeded Lady Aberdeen Marjoribanks as president, serving from 1899 until his death.

In his early years as a judge, he published A Digest of the Criminal Law of Canada, which heavily influenced the groundbreaking Criminal Code, enacted by the federal Parliament in 1892.
