= Maritime Court of Ontario =

Former admiralty court in Ontario

The Maritime Court of Ontario was an admiralty court in Ontario. It was created in 1877 by a statute of the Parliament of Canada. The Exchequer Court of Canada succeeded the Maritime Court by a statute passed in 1891. The Exchequer Court continued in 1971 as the Federal Court of Canada.

== History ==
Prior to Confederation in 1867, vice-admiralty courts had existed in Lower Canada (now Quebec) and in the Maritimes. The Vice-Admiralty Court of Quebec had been established in 1764. The court continued when the old Province of Quebec was split into Lower Canada and Upper Canada in 1791, but its jurisdiction was limited to Lower Canada. There was no vice-admiralty court for Upper Canada (now Ontario).

Beginning in the 1860s, Canadian commentators began to see the need for an admiralty court with jurisdiction over commerce on the Great Lakes. After Confederation, early legislative proposals would have conferred admiralty jurisdiction on the Supreme Court of Canada but the court, created by statute in 1875, was not given such jurisdiction.

In 1877, the parliament of Canada established the Maritime Court of Ontario by the Maritime Jurisdiction Act, 1877. The statute came into force on July 7, 1877.

In 1891, the Exchequer Court of Canada became Canada's admiralty court pursuant to the Admiralty Act, 1891, SC 1891 (54–55 Vict), c 29. The Maritime Court of Ontario was accordingly abolished; its territory became known as the "Toronto Admiralty District" of the new court. The Exchequer Court was continued and reorganized in 1971 as the Federal Court of Canada.

== Jurisdiction ==
The Maritime Court of Ontario had all jurisdiction exercised by then-existing British vice-admiralty courts in similar matters. It could hear both contract and tort claims. Its jurisdiction extended to proceedings in rem and in personam related to navigation, shipping, trade, or commerce on any river, lake, canal, or inland water located in whole or in part in Ontario.

== Practice and procedure ==
When the Maritime Court of Ontario was established, common law and equity had not yet been fused in Ontario. The rules of practice in the Maritime Court were modelled on the general orders of the Court of Chancery of Upper Canada.

The judges of the Maritime Court were the county judges of the county of York sitting in Toronto.

Appeals lay directly from the Maritime Court of Ontario to the Supreme Court of Canada.

== Sources ==
- Bushnell, Ian (1997). The Federal Court of Canada: A History, 1875–1992. University of Toronto Press. ISBN 978-1-4426-8126-2. OCLC 666910898.
- Cox, R. Gregory (January 1888). "The Maritime Court of Ontario". The Canadian Law Times. 8: 1–13. ISSN 0381-1271.
- O'Sullivan, D. A (1879). A Manual of Government in Canada. Toronto: J.C. Stuart & Co. pp. 194–195. ISBN 978-0-665-11556-1. OCLC 1048183806.
- Stone, Arthur J. (2002). "Canada's Admiralty Court in the Twentieth Century". McGill Law Journal. 47 (3): 511–558. 2002 CanLIIDocs 40.
