= Edward Johnson (lawyer) =

Canadian lawyer

- Born: J. Edward Johnson
- Other name: Ted Johnson
- Education: Ivey School of Business (University of Western Ontario), Sciences Po, McGill University, Queen's University at Kingston
- Occupations: Civil servant, lawyer
- Employer(s): Government of Canada, Lang Michener, Power Corporation of Canada
- Organization: Pierre Elliott Trudeau Foundation
- Awards: Order of Canada (2020)

J. Edward "Ted" Johnson OC is the Canadian chair of the Pierre Elliott Trudeau Foundation. He is a former lawyer, civil servant and an Officer of the Order of Canada.

== Education ==
Johnson has an undergraduate degree from the Ivey School of Business at the University of Western Ontario. After graduating he studied at Sciences Po in Paris, before studying law at McGill University, before switching to Queen's University at Kingston. He graduated Queen's University in 1976.

== Career ==
As a newly graduated lawyer, he articled at the Department of Justice before working for Justice Minister Ron Basford, Finance Minister Jean Chrétien and as the Executive Assistant to the Prime Minister Pierre Trudeau. He also worked for the diplomat Robert Fowler. After Trudeau left politics in 1984, Johnson became the General counsel and company secretary for Toronto law firm Lang Michener. In 1985 he additionally took the same two roles at the Montreal-based Power Corporation of Canada.

He has been a mentor to Justin Trudeau. He retired from practicing law in 2018 and was awarded the Order of Canada in December 2020.

In 2002 he co-founded the Pierre Elliott Trudeau Foundation and became a director of the organization in 2001, the Vice Chair in 2018 and the Chair of the Board in 2021. He is also the chair of the board of the National Theatre School of Canada, a director of the Atlantic Salmon Federation and the Vice President of the Royal Canadian Geographical Society.

In April 2023, all but three members of the Pierre Elliott Trudeau Foundation resigned, with Johnson remaining as one of the three who remained on an interim basis. He announced an independent review of the foundation's funding, after media focus on a $140,000 donation from Chinese business man and political strategist Zhang Bin.

== Personal life ==
Johnson lives in Westmount, Quebec. Outside of work, he is a pilot and canoeist who would go on canoe trips with Pierre Trudeau.
