= Walter Cassels =

President of the Exchequer Court of Canada

The Honourable Sir Walter Cassels

President of the Exchequer Court of Canada
- In office 1920–1923
- Preceded by: None
- Succeeded by: Alexander Kenneth Maclean

Personal details
- Born: Quebec City, Canada East, Province of Canada

Sir Walter Gibson Pringle Cassels (14 August 1845 – 1 March 1923) was a Canadian lawyer and judge. He was the first President of the Exchequer Court of Canada from 1920 until his death in 1923.

== Biography ==
Cassels was born in Quebec City, the son of the banker and businessman Robert Cassels. He was educated at Quebec High School and the University of Toronto, graduating with a BA in 1865. He was called to the Bar in Ontario in 1869, and practiced at Blake, Lash, Cassels. He became a Queen's Counsel in 1883.

Cassels was appointed a judge of the Exchequer Court of Canada in 1908 (his brother Robert, as Registrar of the Supreme Court of Canada from 1875 to 1898, had been the Exchequer Court's first registrar). He was knighted in 1917. In 1920, he became the Court's first President when the position was established. As a judge of the Exchequer Court, he was on occasion to sit as an ad hoc judge in the Supreme Court of Canada, which he did thirty-three times from 1918 to 1922. He died in Ottawa in 1923.

Cassels Lake in Temagami, Ontario is named in his honour.

== Arms ==
Coat of arms of Walter Cassels

Notes
Matriculated at the Lyon Court in 1864.
Crest
A dolphin naiant Or.
Escutcheon
Argent a chevron Gules between two cross crosslets fitchee in chief and a key fesswise ward downwards in base Sable.
Motto
Avise Le Fin
