= List of deputy ministers of justice (Canada) =

The public servant in charge of the Canadian Department of Justice (French: Ministère de la Justice du Canada) holds the dual titles of Deputy Minister of Justice and Deputy Attorney General of Canada. The deputy minister provides advice and support to the Minister of Justice and Attorney General of Canada (an elected official) and acts as the main interface between the political and administrative functions of the Government of Canada.

== List deputy ministers of justice and deputy attorneys general of Canada ==
Name	From	To
Hewitt Bernard, CMG	29 May 1868	31 Aug 1876
Zebulon Aiton Lash, QC	1 Sep 1876	22 May 1882
George Wheelock Burbidge	23 May 1882	30 Sep 1887
Robert Sedgewick, QC	25 Feb 1888	17 Feb 1893
Edmund Leslie Newcombe, CMG, KC	13 Mar 1893	19 Sep 1924
W. Stuart Edwards, CMG, KC	1 Oct 1924	30 Se. 1941
Frederick P. Varcoe, CMG, QC	1 Oct 1941	30 Apr 1957
Wilbur R. Jackett, QC	1 May 1957	30 Jun 1960
Elmer Driedger, QC	1 Jul 1960	28 Feb 1967
Donald S. Maxwell, QC	1 Mar 1967	28 Feb 1973
Donald Scarth Thorson, QC	1 Mar 1973	5 Jun 1977
Roger Tassé, OC, QC	18 Jul 1977	29 Sep 1985
Frank Iacobucci, QC	30 Sep 1985	2 Sep 1988
John C. Tait, QC	Oct 1988	Oct 1994
George Thomson, QC	Oct 1994	30 Jun 1998
Morris Rosenberg, QC	1 Jul 1998	2004
John H. Sims, QC	2004	2010
Myles J. Kirvan, QC	6 Apr 2010	5 Nov 2012
William F. Pentney, QC	5 Nov 2012	23 Jun 2017
Nathalie G. Drouin	23 Jun 2017	06 Aug 2021
A. François Daigle	23 Aug 2021	13 Feb 2023
Shalene Curtis-Micallef	13 Feb 2023	present
