= Frederick P. Varcoe =

Frederick Percy Varcoe, CMG, QC (1889 – 15 October 1965) was a Canadian civil servant and lawyer. He served as Deputy Minister of Justice and Deputy Attorney General of Canada from 1941 to 1959.

Varcoe was born in Toronto, Ontario in 1889 and was educated at Harbord Collegiate Institute and the University of Toronto, where he took a BA in 1911. He was appointed to the Department of Finance in 1912, then studied law as Osgoode Hall, and was called to the Bar of Ontario in 1915.

He joined the Department of Justice in 1917, becoming Deputy Minister in 1941 in succession to W. Stuart Edwards. He was created a Dominion King's Counsel in 1941. He retired in 1959. He died in 1965 after a long illness.
