= Pierre Elliott Trudeau Foundation =

Canadian charity

- Fondation Pierre Elliott Trudeau
- Types: Charitable organization
- Legal status: Foundation
- Purpose: Education
- Headquarters: 1980 Sherbrooke Street West; Suite 600; Montreal, Quebec; Canada H3H 1E8
- Country: Canada
- Revenue: 23,316,526 Canadian dollar (2024)
- Total Assets: 164,892,482 Canadian dollar (2024)
- Employees: 20 (2021)
- Website: www.trudeaufoundation.ca

The Pierre Elliott Trudeau Foundation (French: Fondation Pierre Elliott Trudeau), commonly called the Trudeau Foundation (French: Fondation Trudeau), is a Canadian charity founded in 2001 named after former Canadian prime minister Pierre Trudeau.

Donations to the charity increased when Justin Trudeau became the leader of the Liberal Party of Canada, and again in 2015 when the party won the federal election.

In early 2023, most of the board of directors resigned, in light of a $200,000 donation from Chinese political strategist and billionaire Zhang Bin. The donation was reported in the context of allegations of Chinese government interference in the 2019 and 2021 Canadian federal elections.

== Organization ==
The foundation has a board of directors appointed by members. Membership control the bylaws of the organization and the board supervise charitable activities.

Members include Denise Chong, Thomas Axworthy and Alexandre Trudeau, the brother of Canadian Prime Minister Justin Trudeau. Previous board members have included Pierre Trudeau's daughter Sarah Coyne, Chuck Strahl, Megan Leslie, Peter Lougheed and Bill Davis. Previous presidents have included Pierre-Gerlier Forest.

== Activities ==
The foundation funds research and education, including granting twenty doctoral scholarships annually. In additional to financial support, the organisation links academics up with mentors. Mentors affiliated with the foundation have included Beverly McLachlin, Louise Arbour, Anne McLellan, Pierre Pettigrew, Marie Deschamps, Thomas Cromwell, Tony Penikett, Michael Harcourt, Elizabeth May, Michael Fortier, Ed Broadbent, Lorna Williams and Frank Iacobucci.

== History ==
The foundation was founded in 2001, one year after the death of Pierre Elliot Trudeau. In 2002, the Government of Canada endowed the foundation with $125 million. The organization is obliged to not spend the endowment, but instead invest the money and use income from the investments to fund its activities. Justin Trudeau divested his interest in the foundation in 2013 when he entered federal politics. However, the independence of the foundation from the Prime Minister has been questioned after Le Devoir reported that the foundation held round table meetings in the Office of the Prime Minister and Privy Council in 2016 following Trudeau's election. Justin Trudeau claimed to not have known of the 2016 foundation meeting held in the Prime Minister's office. Donations to the foundation increased after 2013 when Justin Trudeau became the leader of the Liberal Party and again in 2016, after the Liberal Party won the 2015 Canadian federal election. The percentage of foreign donors has increased since 2013.

== Directed donation from Chinese government and aftermath ==
In 2015 Chinese billionaire and Chinese Communist Party advisor Zhang Bin attended a Liberal Party of Canada fundraising event before pledging a $200,000 donation to the foundation. An additional $750,000 was donated to Pierre Trudeau's alma mater, the University of Montreal’s Faculty of Law, while $50,000 was allegedly pledged for the construction of a statue at the University of Montreal. Zhang had originally requested that the statue be of both Pierre Trudeau and Mao Zedong, but the University rebuffed this proposal and a statue of only Pierre Trudeau was ultimately planned. The deal to accept the donation was signed by Sacha Trudeau, Justin Trudeau's brother, who also attended the event commemorating the combined $1-million donation as a director and member of the foundation, with Zhang and Chinese consulate staff in attendance.

In March 2023, former chief executive Morris Rosenberg defended media criticism of the donation by saying that Canada and China had had a better relationship at time. Allegations regarding the role of the Chinese Communist Party in directing and funding the donation were revealed as part of a series of leaks claiming to be from the CSIS regarding Chinese political interference in Canada. On March 1, 2023, the foundation announced that it would return the $140,000 that it has thus far received from Zhang. The remainder of Zhang's $200,000 donation was never received.

On April 11, 2023, all but three of the board of directors, including president Pascale Fournier resigned citing controversy over the Zhang's donation. Three directors remained in post on a temporary basis in order to meet legal minimums. On April 12, day La Presse reported that other governance concerns had led to the resignations, including record keeping issues that prevented returning the $140,000 donation. As a result, the board concluded that it would be "unlawful" to return the donation as they had committed to do.

On April 12, the foundation's board chair Edward Johnson said that it would commission an independent review of Zhang's donation. The foundation also requested that the Auditor General of Canada conduct a review, however, the office declined because its mandate is limited to reviews of federal government departments, agencies, Crown corporations, and those of territorial governments. On April 28, 2023, former chair Pascale Fournier testified at a parliamentary ethics committee. Fournier said that she did not know who was behind the $140,000 donation to the foundation and that while the money was formally received from Millennium Golden Eagle International (Canada), the company provided an address in Beijing rather than the address in Hong Kong that matched the website address of the company's parent company. The Canadian Security Intelligence Service intercepted the telecommunications of Millennium Golden Eagle International leader Zhang Bin and heard promises that the donation would be reimbursed by the Government of China.

In testimony before the House of Commons ethics committee on May 3, 2023, Sacha Trudeau called Zhang Bin "honorable", insisting that the foundation was never the target of foreign interference and that he "had seen no trace of it".

== See also ==
- WE Charity scandal
