= Elmer Driedger =

Canadian lawyer (1913–1985)

Elmer A. Driedger, QC (1913–1985) was a Canadian lawyer and a leading authority on statutory interpretation. He worked for the Canadian Department of Justice for over a quarter century, rising to Deputy Minister and later became a professor of law at the University of Ottawa.

== Early life and education ==
Elmer A. Driedger was born in Osler, Saskatchewan, 14 January 1913, to a Mennonite family and grew up speaking German as well as English. He attended elementary school in Osler and high school in Rosthern.

Driedger entered the University of Saskatchewan in 1929, receiving his B.A. degree in 1932 and his LL.B. degree in 1934.

He won a scholarship to the University of Marburg and studied there from 1934-1935: "The combination of his academic ability and German led to a scholarship at Marburg University, offered on somewhat the same criteria as the Rhodes scholarships"

He attended Kiel University in 1935, but "political developments in Germany force[d] his return to Canada a year so before the war."

== Career ==
After returning from Germany to Depression-stricken Saskatchewan, he "ek[ed] out a living in Yorkton" and lectured in Company Law at the University of Saskatchewan.

Driedger was hired in December 1940 as a librarian for the Supreme Court of Canada, working under Chief Justice Lyman Duff.

He joined the Department of Justice in December 1941, where he became the Department's main legislative draftsman. He was appointed an Assistant Deputy Minister of Justice in 1954 and then Deputy Minister of Justice 1 July 1960. He retired from the Department in 1967.

He was subsequently appointed Consul General of Canada to Hamburg on 1 March 1967.

Driedger joined Queen's University's Faculty of Law in August 1969. He then joined the University of Ottawa Faculty of Law in July 1970, retiring in June 1979.

Driedger also established a course in legislative drafting funded by the federal government.

== Professional involvement ==
- He was a member of the Statute Revision Commissions of 1949 and 1965.
- He was a member of the National Council on Administration of Justice, 1958-1967.
- He was a member of the Commissioners on Uniformity of Legislation, 1947-1967.
- He was a member of the Law Societies of Upper Canada and of Saskatchewan
- He was appointed a federal King's Counsel in 1949
- He assisted the Commonwealth Secretariat in the setting up of its courses on legislative drafting and he advised the Government of Australia in establishing the Legislative Drafting Institute (now defunct).

== Current influence ==
His principle of statutory interpretation is the Supreme Court of Canada's preferred approach. The principle, which was originally laid out in his 1974 book, The Construction of Statutes, was quoted verbatim in the court's decision in Rizzo & Rizzo Shoes Ltd.:

Today there is only one principle or approach, namely, the words of an Act are to be read in their entire context and in their grammatical and ordinary sense harmoniously with the scheme of the Act, the object of the Act, and the intention of Parliament.

The Construction of Statutes became an influential text in Canadian legal circles. A second edition was published in 1983. Following Driedger's death, Ruth Sullivan, a law professor at the University of Ottawa, substantially revised Driedger's text in the third edition published in 1994. A fourth edition was published in 2002, and a fifth edition in 2008. Sullivan has become so closely associated with the updated edition of the book that it has since been retitled, Sullivan on the Construction of Statutes.

== Family ==
Driedger was married to Elsie Driedger and the couple had two sons.

== Awards ==
Driedger was awarded an honorary Doctor of Laws degree by the University of Ottawa in 1963.

== Books and articles ==
- "Legislative Drafting" (1949)
- "The Retrospective Operation of Statutes" (1950)
- "Memorandum on the Drafting of Acts of Parliament and Subordinate Legislation" (1951)
- "A New Approach to Statutory Interpretation" (1951)
- "The Preparation of Legislation" (1953)
- The composition of legislation (1957)
- "Subordinate Legislation" (1959)
- "Constitutional Amendment in Canada" (1962)
- Legislative forms and precedents (1963)
- "The Canadian Bill of Rights" (1968)
- "Statute of Westminster and Constitutional Amendment" (1968)
- The Construction of Statutes (1974)
- The composition of legislation: legislative forms and precedents (1976)
- "The Meaning and Effect of the Canadian Bill of Rights: A Draftsman's Viewpoint" (1977)
- Codification Des Actes De L'Amerique Du Nord Britannique, 1867 a 1975, (ed) ISBN 0-660-00510-7
- "Statutes: Retroactive Reflections" (1978)
- "Statutes: The Mischievous Literal Golden Rules." (1981)
- A manual of instructions for legislative and legal writing (1982)
- "The Canadian Charter of Rights and Freedoms" (1982)
- Construction of Statutes (2nd ed., 1983) ISBN 0-409-82803-3 cited 14 times by the Supreme Court of Canada in 2006.
