= Wilbur Jackett =

Canadian scholar and chief justice

Wilbur Roy Jackett
- Born: June 27, 1912; Tompkins, Saskatchewan
- Died: September 10, 2005 (aged 93)
- Awards: Order of Canada

Wilbur Roy Jackett, OC QC (June 27, 1912 – September 10, 2005) was a Canadian scholar, public servant, jurist, and the first chief justice of the Federal Court of Canada.

Born in Tompkins, Saskatchewan, Jackett moved with his family to Kamsack, Saskatchewan in 1920 at the age of eight. After graduating from high school in Kamsack, Jackett graduated with degrees in both arts and law from the University of Saskatchewan. In 1933 he was selected a Rhodes Scholar and studied at the University of Oxford. He was called to the Bar of Saskatchewan.

From 1957 to 1960, he was the eighth Deputy Minister of the federal Department of Justice. In 1960 he became general counsel for the Canadian Pacific Railway. He was later appointed president of the Exchequer Court of Canada. He was the first Chief Justice of the Federal Court of Canada from 1971 until 1979.

On 9 May 1958, he was awarded an honorary DCL from the University of Saskatchewan. In 1981, he was made an Officer of the Order of Canada.
