= Zhang Bin (political strategist) =

Chinese business and political person

- Employer: Millennium Golden Eagle International
- Organization: China Cultural Industry Association
- Known for: Philanthropy to the Pierre Elliott Trudeau Foundation
- Political party: Chinese Communist Party

Zhang Bin is a Chinese political strategist and business magnate.

He is the chairman of the Chinese-state affiliated Millennium Golden Eagle International, an advisor to the Chinese Communist Party, and the chair of the China Cultural Industry Association.

== Adult life and career ==
Zhang is a Chinese billionaire who is the chairman of the Chinese-state affiliated company Millennium Golden Eagle International and works as an advisor to the Chinese Communist Party. As an official of the party, he promotes China's interests overseas. Zhang is the president of the China Cultural Industry Association, and the managing director of the National Animation Game Industry Base Management Committee. In his role at the China Cultural Industry Association, Zhang has met with John William Ashe the President of the United Nations General Assembly, Vijay K. Nambiar the Under-Secretary-General of the United Nations, Irina Bokova, the Director General of UNESCO, and Francis Lorenzo, the president of the International Organization for South-South Cooperation.

In 2013, Zhang donated $800,000 to the University of Toronto Faculty of Medicine. In 2023, the Université de Montreal was considering returning a $750,000 donation to Zhang.

In 2016, Zhang met Justin Trudeau and after attending a Liberal Party of Canada fundraiser hosted by the Chinese Business Chamber of Commerce, he pledged to donate $200,000 to the Pierre Elliott Trudeau Foundation. However, only $140,000 was received. Shortly after the event, Zhang donated $1m to the foundation. The $200,000 donation made national news in Canada in 2023, leading to the resignation of most of the board of directors of the foundation.

== See also ==
- Canada–China relations
- Chinese government interference in the 2019 and 2021 Canadian federal elections
