= China Cultural Industry Association =

Chinese trade association and cultural institution

- Logo
- Predecessor: Liaoning Folk Art Ensemble, Bensham Media Company
- Formation: 2013
- Type: Umbrella organization, trade association, cultural institution
- Chairman: Zhang Bin (political strategist)
- Website: www.chncia.org/en/

The China Cultural Industry Association is an umbrella trade association and cultural institution led by Zhang Bin.

== Description ==
The China Cultural Industry Association is a Chinese umbrella media organisation that also works to build "the soft power of Chinese culture."

== Organisation ==
The China Cultural Industry Association website states that it is an independent organisation registered with the Ministry of Civil Affairs.

The organisation is led by billionaire political strategist and business person Zhang Bin and is noted for is proximity to the Government of China.

== History ==
The China Cultural Industry Association website states that it was founded on June 29, 2013. The organisation previously operated as a media company. Established in 2003, the Liaoning Folk Art Ensemble later became the Bensham Media Company before being renamed as the China Cultural Industry Association in 2011.

From 2011, the company became very profitable as it delivered media in Northeast China.

In 2014, the association funded the erection of a statue of Norman Bethune located at the University of Toronto Faculty of Medicine. In 2016, the association stated that it had created the Trudeau Education Fund at the Universite de Montreal. In 2023, the university was considering returning the $750,000 donation to Zhang.

In 2022, on behalf of various Chinese technology companies, the association published a fourteen-page "self-discipline initiative", a corporate self-governance model for trading in non-fungible tokens. The rules centred around transparency and discouraging anonymous trading.
