= Metal zipper =

Zipper with metal binding edges

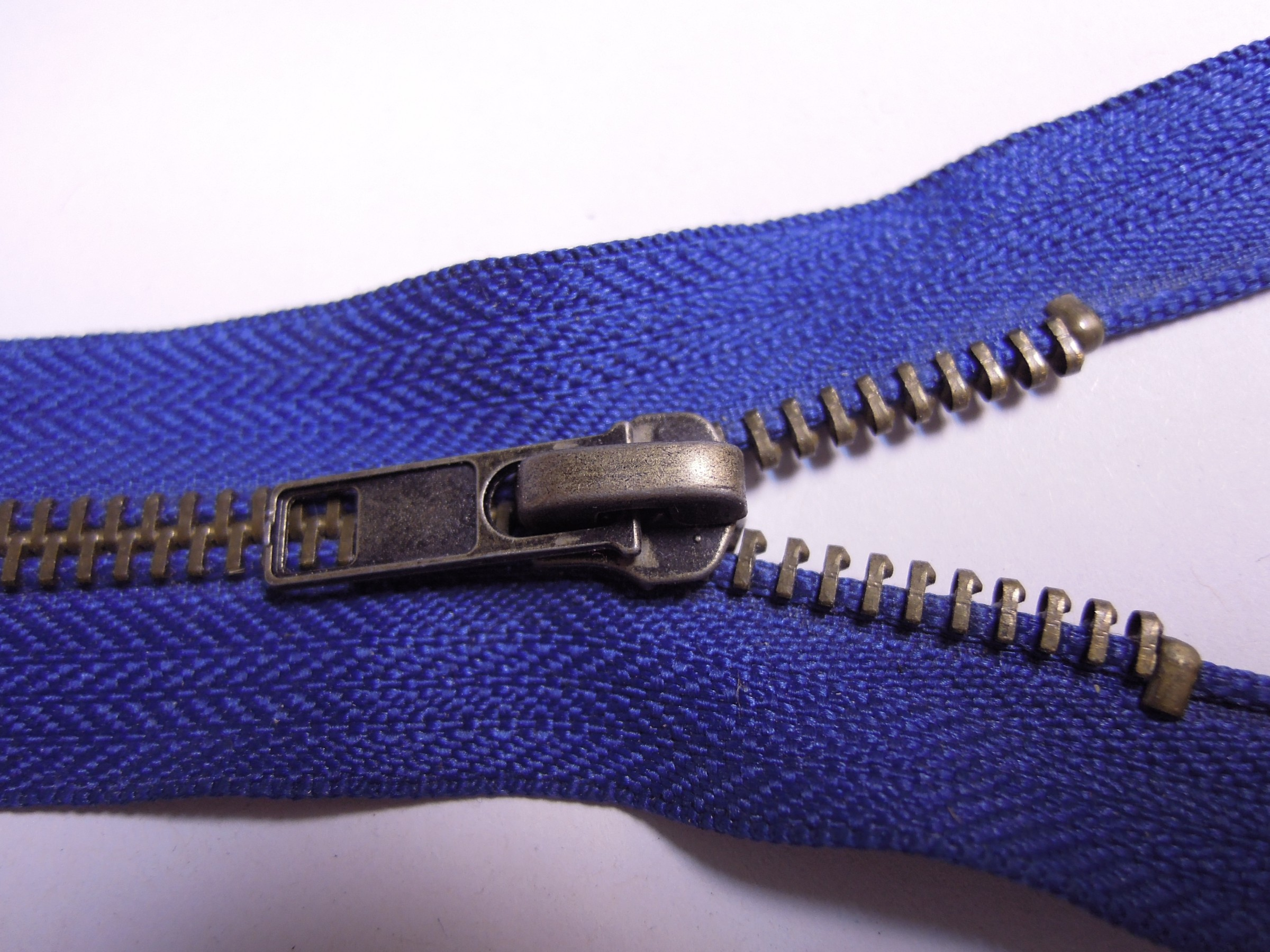
A zipper with metal teeth

A metal zipper is a zipper with its binding edges consisting of individual pieces of metal that are molded into shape and set at regular intervals on the zipper tape. Metal zippers are mainly made of brass, nickel and aluminium, and given their durability, they are mostly used in jeans, work-wear, heavy luggage and heavy-duty garments that must withstand high strength and tough washing.

The metal zipper is the oldest type of workable zipper, having been invented by Gideon Sundback as an improvement of Whitcomb Judson's "Clasp Locker" that majorly consisted of a hook-and-eye shoe fastener.

== Description ==
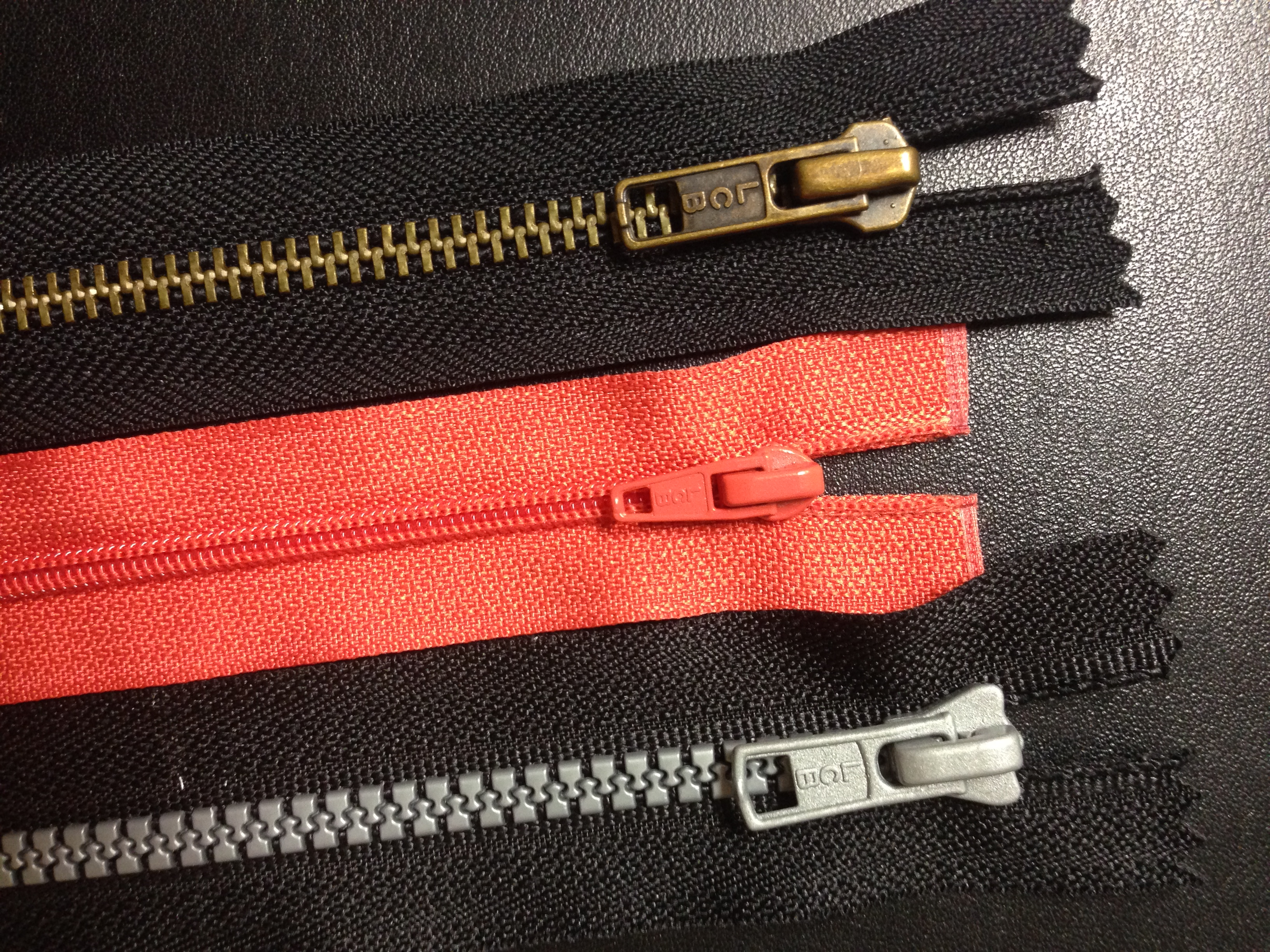
Zippers with metal (top), coil (middle) and plastic (bottom) teeth

A metal zipper consists of two rows of protruding teeth made of metal. The metal teeth may be made of Brass, Aluminium or Nickel, and they are designed to interlock like clasped hands, linking the rows, thus creating a "Continuous Clothing Closure" as Elias Howe would have referred to it. For this to be possible, the metal zipper is usually fitted with a slider, often made of metal. The slider is operated by hand, and depending on the direction of its movement, the two rows of protruding metal teeth will either be interlocked or separated. This allows for full of partial fastening of the zipper depending on the user's preference.

Metal zippers are most effective when used on heavy weight or thick materials such as denim and leather among other heavy-duty fabrics. These zippers are commonly found in denim trousers and jackets, leather outfits, shoes and heavy luggage and bags. Metal zippers are present in a wide variety of designs depending on their desired use, including open-ended, two way open-ended and two way closed-ended designs among others. These designs can be achieved by sewing one end of the zipper, sewing both of its ends together or allowing both of its ends to fall apart respectively.

Unlike plastic zippers, metal zippers are stronger and more durable. Though, they also fail at some point and this may render the garment or bag unusable. Most metal zippers fail when the insertion pin tears loose from the tape, when one or multiple metal teeth fall off the tape or when the slider jams or breaks off. For the zipper to be usable again, it should be replaced or repaired.

== Types ==
Metal zippers are found in various types as listed below.

- Closed-end metal zipper.
- Open-end metal zipper.
- Two way open-end metal zipper.
- Two way closed-end metal zipper.
- Reversible slider.
- Air and water tight metal zipper.
- Double side teeth metal zipper.

== History ==
The first attempt at making a zipper was in 1851, when Elias Howe was working on the "Automatic Continuous Clothing Closure". His creation resembled a drawstring and didn't really qualify to be an automatic zipper, but it was a great start for the zipper market.

In 1893, Whitcomb Judson came up with an improvement of Howe's prototype which was basically a hook-and-eye shoe fastener. Even though his invention wasn't a practical zipper per se, Judson is still referred to as the father/inventor of the zipper.

1917 saw the invention of the first practical zipper by Gideon Sundback, originally referred to as the "Separable Fastener”. This is actually the first metal zipper that was made and it consisted of scoops of a special Y-shaped wire that were punched, nibbed and clamped onto a cloth tape to produce two facing rows that created a continuous zipper chain.

1923 saw Sundback's Separable Fastener's first use on a rubber boots. It then started being referred to as the "Zipper" from the "zip" sound produced when this device is used. Its use then moved to tobacco pouches, and in 1925, it was used on leather jackets. Ever since, the metal zipper has transitioned into denim trousers, children’s clothing, luggage, shoes, leather goods and other objects that require easier fastening.

== Components ==
A metal zipper functions just like any other zipper, with a number of similar components. The components of a metal zipper include:

Zipper teeth
Also known as the chain, it includes the two continuous rows of metal teeth protrusions that are meshed together to close the zipper or separate it. The zipper teeth or chain is measured in terms of chain width gauge size. The bigger the gauge number, the wider the chain width.
Slider
This refers to the device that is pulled up or down to open or close the zipper. It is what clasps the zipper teeth or separates them depending on the direction of movement. Attached to it is the pull tab, the extension that is held when moving the zipper up or down. Some sliders come with a zip-lock feature in that, when the pull tab is lowered, it locks the slider in place and when raised, it unlocks it.
Tape
This refers to the strips of fabric to which the zipper teeth are attached. There are usually two strips of tape, with the sides with zipper teeth attached facing each other, and the other sides sewed to the outfit, luggage, shoes or other fabrics. The tape should have top and bottom extensions that extend beyond the teeth for easier sewing at the ends of the zipper.
Top stop and bottom stop
These are metal devices that are affixed at the top and bottom ends of the zipper respectively, to prevent the slider from coming out of the zipper chain. The bottom stop also prevents the already interlocked zipper teeth from separating into half.
Insertion pin and retainer box
These are found exclusively on separating zippers. The pin box or retainer box aligns the insertion pin and the rest of the separating zipper to begin clasping of the zipper teeth. The insertion pin is the metallic end of the zipper that it placed into the retainer box to allow the joining of the two halves of the zipper.

== Manufacturers ==
The first manufacturer of the metal zipper was B. F. Goodrich Company in 1923. Since then, there have been a number of key players in the metal zipper manufacture industry, with the following being the most consistent and most respectable producers around the world.

- Yoshida Kogyo Kabushikikaisha (YKK) (Japan)
- Talon Zipper (USA)
- Tex Corp (India)
- Cremalleras Rubi (Europe)
