= YKK =

Japanese publicly traded manufacturing group (founded 1934)

YKK Corporation

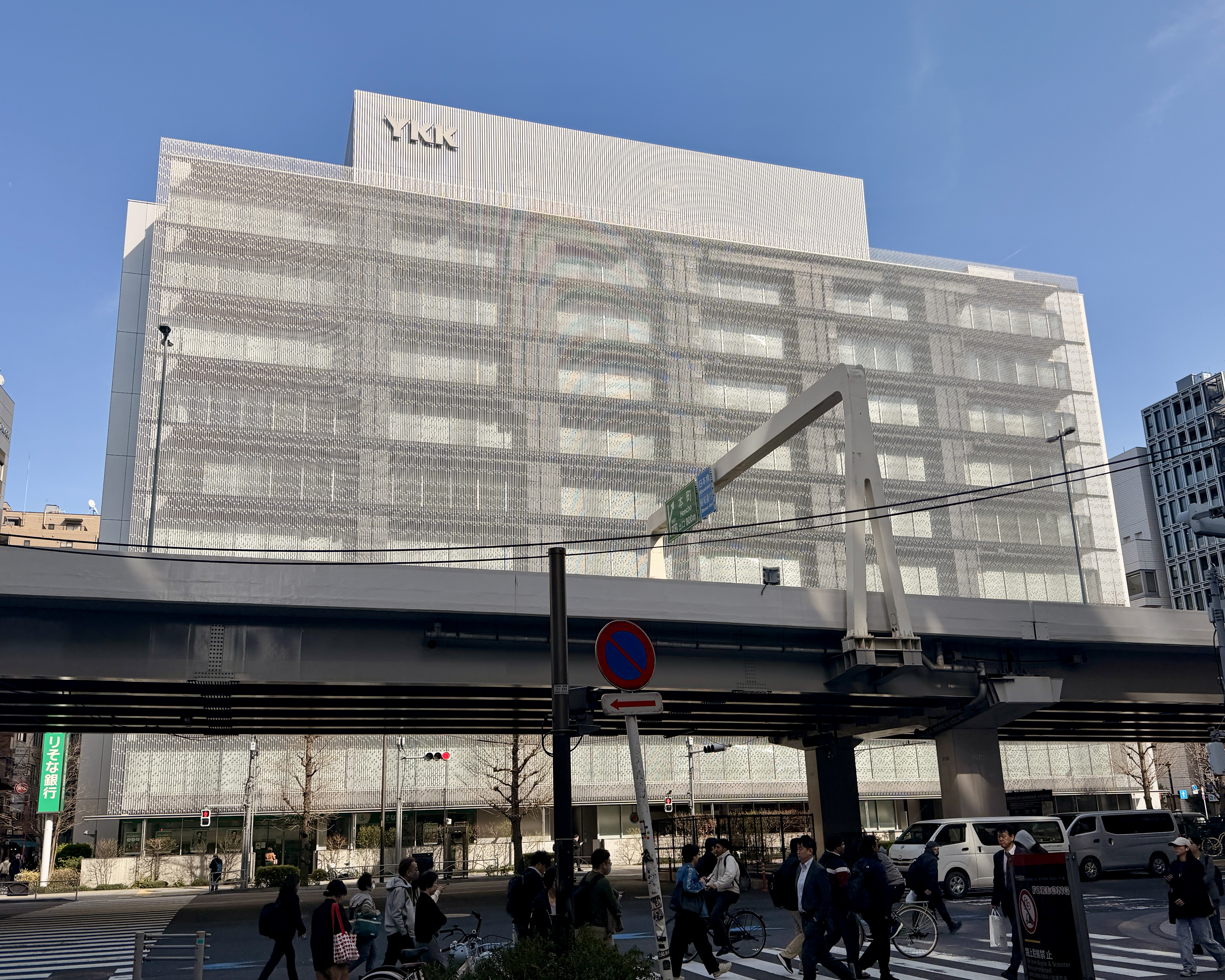
- YKK's headquarters in Chiyoda, Tokyo
- Native name: YKK株式会社
- Formerly: San-es Shokai, Yoshida Kōgyō Kabushikigaisha (吉田工業株式会社)
- Type: Private KK
- Industry: Manufacturing
- Founded: Nihonbashi, Tokyo (January 1, 1934; 92 years ago)
- Founder: Tadao Yoshida
- Headquarters: Kanda Izumi-cho, Chiyoda-ku, Tokyo 101-8642, Japan
- Area served: Worldwide
- Key people: Tadahiro Yoshida (Chairman and CEO); Hiroaki Ōtani (President)
- Products: Fastening products; Windows and doors; Building facades; Production machinery
- Revenue: ▲JPY 920.2 billion (FY 2023) (US$ 6.1 billion) (FY 2023)
- Net income: ▲JPY 42.4 billion (FY 2023) (US$ 279 million) (FY 2023)
- Number of employees: 45,363 (consolidated as of March 31, 2024)
- Website: Official website

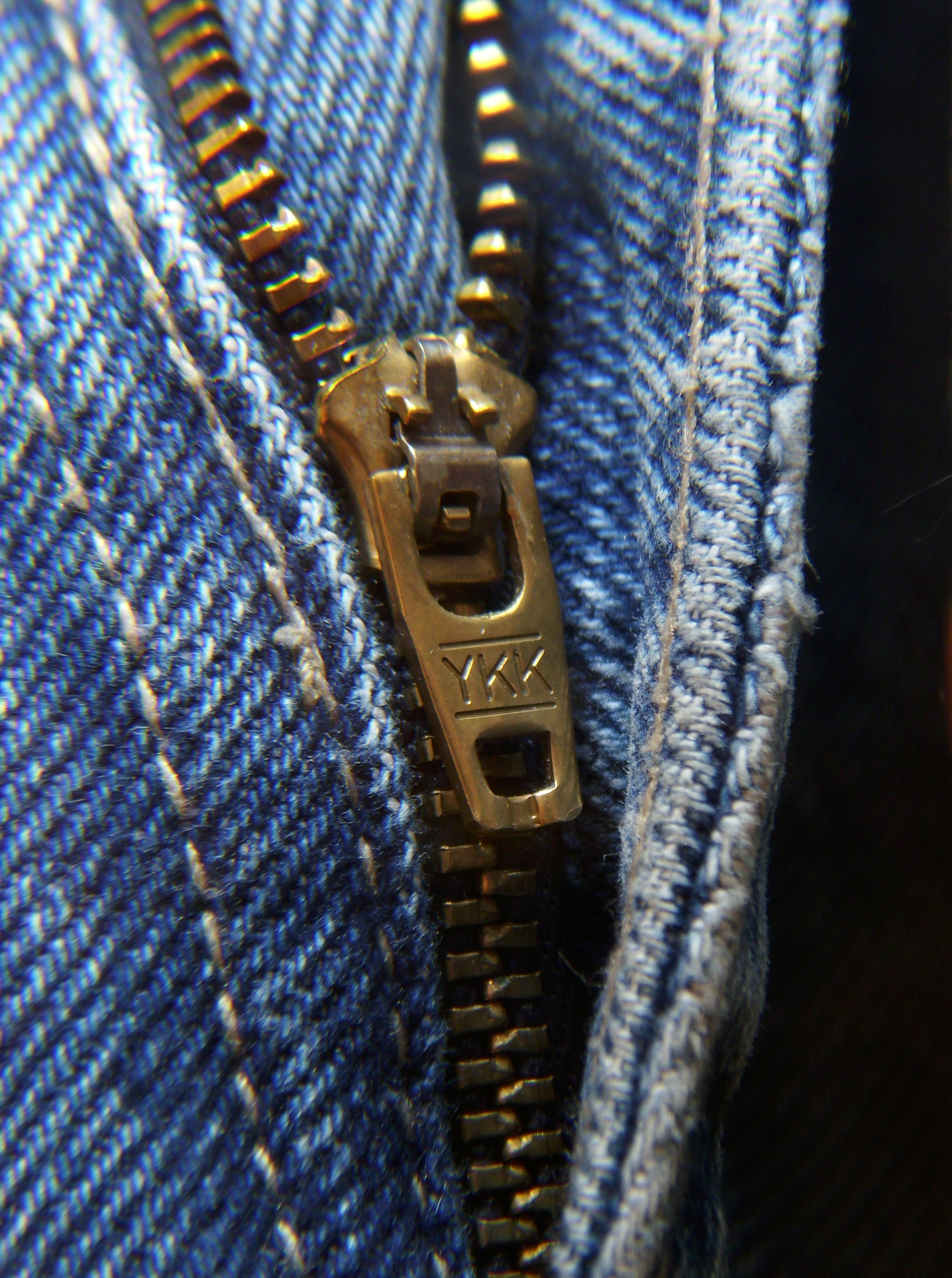
Closeup of a YKK zipper on blue jeans

YKK Corporation (YKK株式会社) is a Japanese manufacturing company headquartered in Chiyoda, Tokyo. It is best known globally as the world's largest manufacturer of zippers, accounting for approximately 45% of the global market share. Beyond its core fastening products, the company also operates a major building materials division through its subsidiary YKK AP.

The enterprise was founded in January 1934 by Tadao Yoshida, initially operating under the name San-es Shokai. Following a renaming to Yoshida Kogyosho in 1942, the business was incorporated as Yoshida Kogyo K.K. in 1945. The abbreviation YKK was first adopted as a trademark in 1946, and the company eventually changed to its current official name, YKK Corporation, in 1994.

== History ==
=== Before World War II ===
What would later become YKK operated initially as San-es Shokai and was founded by Tadao Yoshida in Higashi Nihonbashi, Tokyo in January 1934. The company specialized in marketing of fastening products. In February 1938, San-es Shokai was renamed to Yoshida Kogyosho. WWII was underway by 1939, and the next major corporate event would not take place until February 1942 when the company reorganized as a limited corporation.

=== After World War II ===
In January 1946, the company registered the YKK trademark. A major technological change came in 1950, when the company purchased a chain machine from the U.S. that allowed the automation of the zipper making process. Previously, YKK zippers were made by hand, and hence had an inferior quality compared to automated zippers from abroad.

In March 1951, YKK relocated its headquarters to Chūō, Tokyo. In May 1955, a new plant was opened in Kurobe, Toyama. In August 1958, the headquarters was again relocated to Taitō, Tokyo. In this year, the company also introduced its new Conceal brand that does not show the teeth of the zippers. Another major step came in November 1959, with the opening of its first overseas location, producing YKK zippers in New Zealand. YKK's first US office opened in New York City in 1960 and is now the country's top supplier of zippers and other fastening devices such as snaps and buttons. As the company grew, it brought every step of manufacturing in-house, including smelting brass and dyeing cloth.

=== Diversification ===
In November 1961, the product line was diversified to include aluminium products for buildings. In June 1963, the company relocated its headquarters again to Chiyoda, Tokyo, the current location of the company. In 1966, a new product YZip was introduced, an extra strong and durable zipper for jeans. The development of a machine that automatically included the YZip zipper into the stitching process of jeans further increased sales, especially in the USA. In 1968, YKK opened its first branch in Canada. Its Canadian headquarters are currently in Montreal, Quebec. There was further expansion in the 1970s, with the opening of three new plants in Utazu, Kagawa in April 1972, in Sanbongi, Miyagi in June 1974, and in Yatsushiro, Kumamoto in February 1975. YKK also opened a fastener-making factory in Eswatini which has grown to supply the entire sub-Saharan region, including Madagascar and Mauritius.

More product lines became available with the Quicklon (sometimes called Cosmolon) fasteners in December 1981. International and product expansion continued during the 1980s, with a real estate business in Singapore in December 1984, an agricultural business in Brazil in January 1985, and a plant in Indonesia in September 1986 producing zippers and aluminium parts for buildings. The company was finally renamed YKK in August 1994.

=== New millennium ===
In July 2000, the company established YKK Newmax Co., Ltd, specializing in the production of snaps and buttons. In December 2002, a machine company was established in Suzhou, China. In April 2003, a research and development facility was established in Hokkaido, Japan. A company specializing in sales, YKK Fastening Products Sales Inc. was established in February 2003. YKK AP Inc. was founded in October 2003, specializing in architectural products. Overall, the organization operates 111 affiliated companies in 71 countries, with 42,154 employees.

==== Price fixing ====
On September 19, 2007, YKK was fined €150.3 million by the European Commission for running worldwide price-fixing cartels and sharing markets with zipper-makers Prym and Coats. Coats of Britain and Prym of Germany were fined €122.4 million and €40.5 million respectively for their participation in cartel behaviour. YKK lost its appeal to the General Court on June 27, 2012. It then launched an appeal to the European Court of Justice on September 5, 2012.

In October 2014, part of the fine was reduced by the European high court from €19.25 million to €2.79 million.

== Products ==
=== Fastening products ===
Fastening products are the first and still the most important product of YKK. Within YKK, the company distinguishes between the Slide Fastener Division, the Textile and Plastic Products Division, and the Snap Fastener and Button Division.

- Zippers
  - Standard Metal
  - YZiP: Metal zipper, extra durable for jeans
  - EverBright: Metal zipper, polished for visual appeal, corrosion resistant
  - Excella: Metal zipper, polished and plated for visual appeal, also in different colours (silver, gold, and "antique" finish)
  - Standard Coil
  - Conceal: Plastic coil zipper with concealed elements (no visible teeth)
  - Vislon: Standard – rugged plastic zipper
- Hook and loop products
- Plastic parts, including various types of clips and buckles
- Snaps and buttons, including snap fasteners and jeans buttons

On August 26, 2013, YKK Corporation filed a patent infringement complaint in the Middle District of Georgia against Velcro USA Inc. of Manchester, New Hampshire, relating to a fastener strip used in foam moulded products like a cushion body used for an automobile seat.

=== Architectural products ===
Architectural Aluminium products include fenestration systems for glass exteriors; entrances for commercial and institutional structures; Aluminium sunshades and residential windows. It is based in Atlanta, Georgia, USA.

YKK AP America Inc. manufactures entrances, store fronts, curtain wall, window wall, sunshades, windows and sliding doors for office buildings, residential high-rises, schools, stadiums, shopping centres and institutional structures.

=== Machinery and engineering ===
The Machinery and Engineering Group focuses on the development and production of machines, equipment, and dyes, serving YKK Group with the Exclusive Machinery Division, Industrial Machinery Division, and Dye Division.

=== Facilities ===
As of March 31, 2020, YKK has manufacturing facilities in 70 countries.
