= Zipper =

Device for binding the edges of an opening of fabric or other flexible material

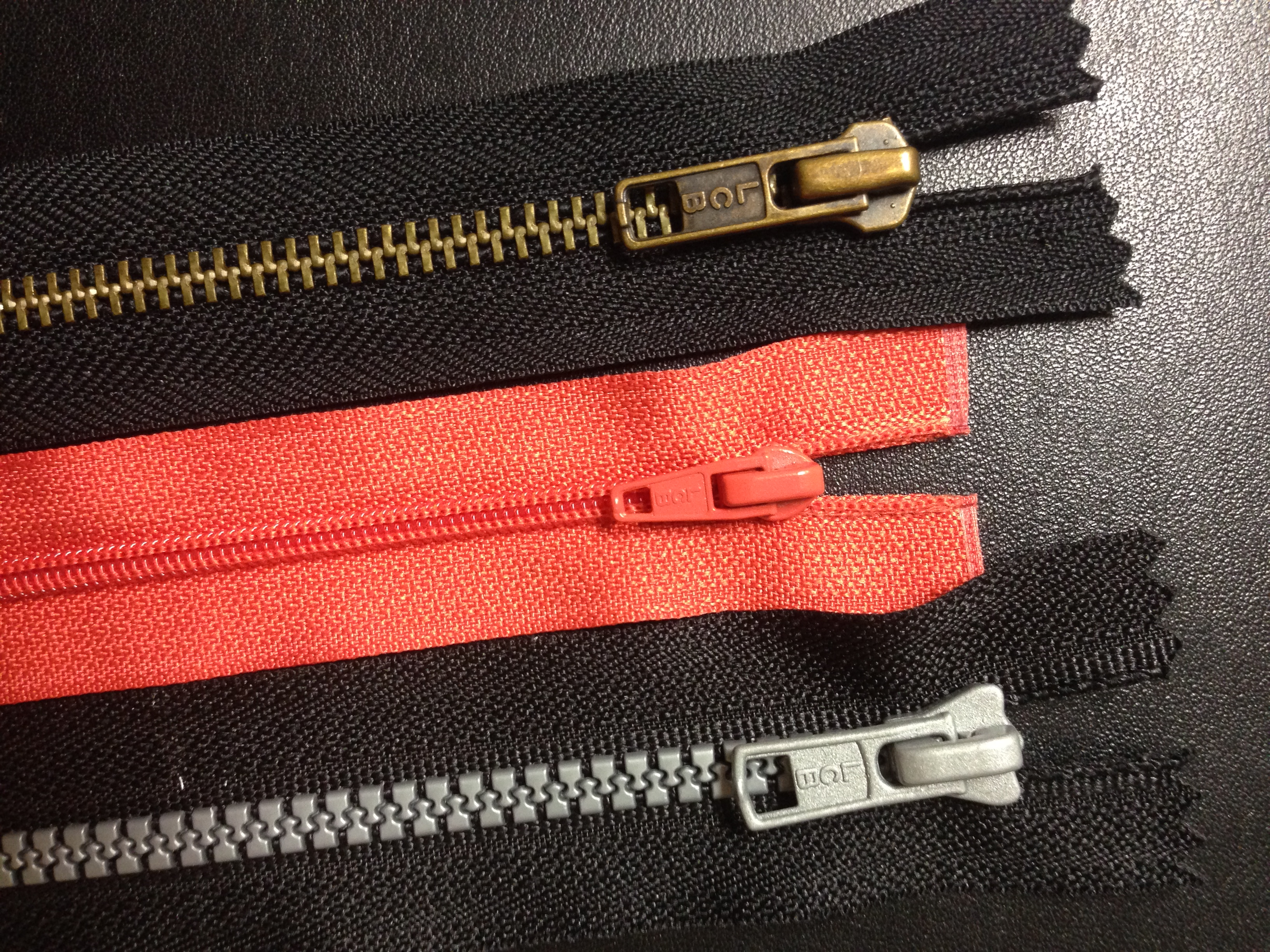
Zippers with common teeth variations: metal teeth (top), coil teeth and plastic teeth

A zipper (N. America), zip, zip fastener (UK), formerly known as a clasp locker, is a commonly used device for binding together two edges of fabric or other flexible material. Used in clothing (e.g., jackets and jeans), luggage and other bags, camping gear (e.g., tents and sleeping bags), and many other items, zippers come in a wide range of sizes, shapes, and colors. In 1892, Whitcomb L. Judson, an American inventor from Chicago, patented the original design from which the modern device evolved.

The zipper gets its name from a brand of rubber boots (or galoshes) it was used on in 1923. The galoshes could be fastened with a single zip of the hand, and soon the hookless fasteners came to be called "Zippers".

== Description ==
A zipper consists of a slider mounted on two rows of metal or plastic teeth that are designed to interlock, and thereby join the material to which the rows are attached. The slider, usually operated by hand, contains a Y-shaped channel that, by moving along the rows of teeth, meshes or separates them, depending on the direction of the slider's movement. The teeth may be individually discrete or shaped from a continuous coil, and are also referred to as elements. The word zipper is onomatopoetic, as the device makes a high-pitched zip when used.

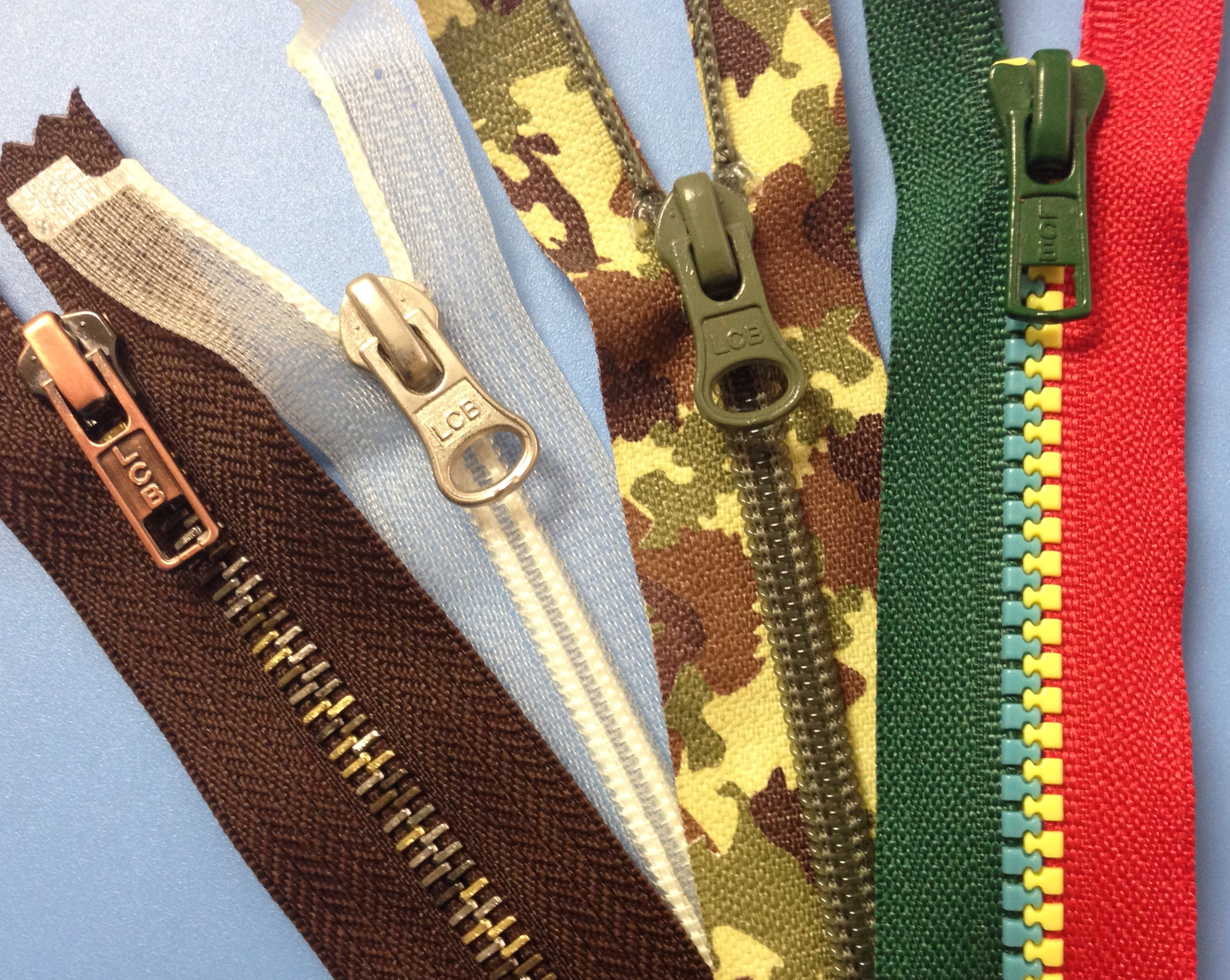
Examples of special zippers with different tape materials, colors and patterns

In many jackets and similar garments, the opening is closed completely when the slider is at the top end. Some jackets have double-separating zippers with two sliders on the tape. When the sliders are on opposite ends of the tape, the jacket is closed. If the lower slider is raised then the bottom part of the jacket may be opened to allow more comfortable sitting or bicycling. When both sliders are lowered then the zipper may be totally separated.

Bags, suitcases and other pieces of luggage also often feature two sliders on the tape: the part of the zipper between them is unfastened. When the two sliders are located next to each other, which can be at any point along the tape, the zipper is fully closed.

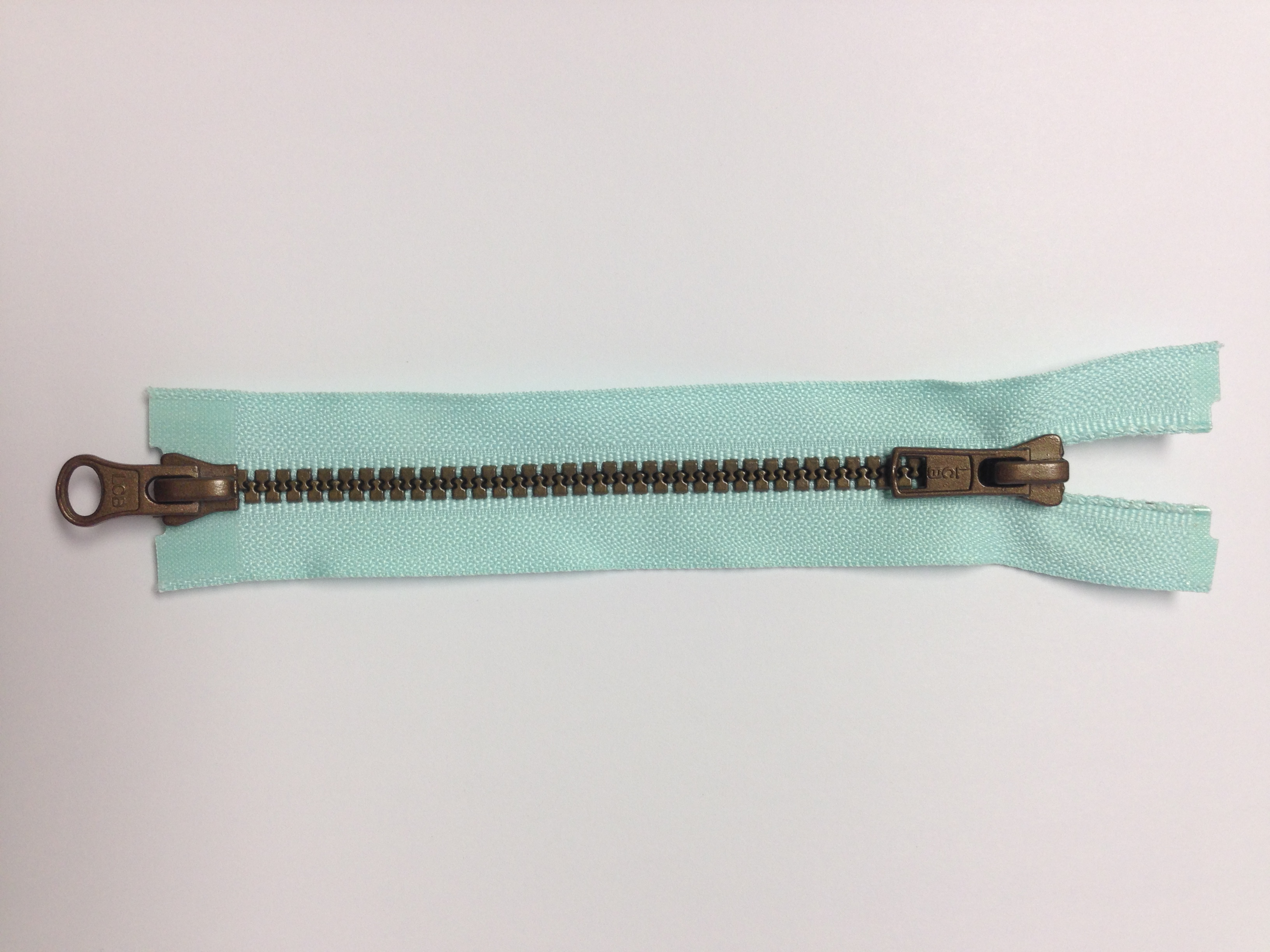
A two-way (double-separating) zipper

Zippers may:

- increase or decrease the size of an opening to allow or restrict the passage of objects, as in the fly of trousers or in a pocket;
- join or separate two ends or sides of a single garment, as in the front of a jacket, or on the front, back or side of a dress or skirt to facilitate dressing;
- attach or detach a separable part of the garment to or from another, as in the conversion between trousers and shorts or the connection or disconnection of a hood and a coat;
- attach or detach a small pouch or bag to or from a larger one. One example of this is military rucksacks, which have smaller pouches or bags attached to the sides using one or two zippers;
- be used to decorate an item.

These variations are achieved by sewing one end of the zipper together, sewing both ends together, or allowing both ends of the zipper to fall completely apart.

A zipper costs relatively little, but if it fails, the garment may be unusable until the zipper is repaired or replaced—which can be quite difficult and expensive. Problems often lie with the zipper slider; when it becomes worn it does not properly align and join the alternating teeth. With separating zippers, the insertion pin may tear loose from the tape; the tape may even disintegrate from use. If a zipper fails, it can either jam (i.e. get stuck) or partially break off.

== History ==
In 1851, Elias Howe received a patent for an "Improvement in Fastenings for Garments". He did not try seriously to market it, thus missing the recognition that he might otherwise have received. Howe's device was more like an elaborate drawstring than a true slide fastener. During this year Howe aimed to create automatic garment fasteners after his sewing machine became widely popular. Elias Howe Jr. played an important role in zipper development but he did not create the original concept of this invention.

Forty-two years later, in 1893, Whitcomb L. Judson patented a "Shoe-Fastening". Judson decided to develop a new shoelace alternative which replaced the standard boot laces for men and women. Judson secured a second patent through his "clasp-locker" design on August 29th of 1893. The initial prototype functioned despite having mechanical problems that resulted in jamming occurrences. Judson along with his partner Lewis Walker had implemented the device directly into their own boots. The device served as a (more complicated) hook-and-eye shoe fastener. With the support of businessman Colonel Lewis Walker, Judson launched the Universal Fastener Company to manufacture the new device. Judson's "clasp locker" had its public debut at the 1893 Chicago World's Fair and met with little commercial success. He exhibited his clasp-locker at the World's Fair in Chicago of 1893 but the invention received minimal public attention. Judson is sometimes given credit as the inventor of the zipper, but his device was not used in clothing.

The Universal Fastener Company moved to Hoboken, New Jersey, in 1901, reorganized as the Fastener Manufacturing and Machine Company. Gideon Sundbäck, a Swedish-American electrical engineer, was hired to work for the company in 1906. The company moved to Meadville, Pennsylvania, where it operated for most of the 20th century under the name Talon, Inc. Sundbäck worked on improving the fastener, and, in 1909, he registered a patent in Germany. The US rights to this invention were in the name of the Meadville company (operating as the Hookless Fastener Co.), but Sundbäck retained non-U.S. rights and used these in subsequent years to set up Lightning Fastener Co. in St. Catharines, Ontario, Canada. Sundbäck's work with this firm has led to the common misperception that he was Canadian and that the zipper originated in that country. Sundbäck redesigned the Judson fastener to create a more durable design, and the zipper first went on sale in 1913.

In 1916, newspapers in Australia reported displays of the "new hookless fastener", a device from America that "the world has been waiting for" by a live model in the store window of Raynor's of Melbourne.

Sundbäck increased the number of fastening elements from four per inch (about one every 6.4 mm) to ten or eleven (around every 2.5 mm), introduced two facing rows of teeth that pulled into a single piece by the slider and increased the opening for the teeth guided by the slider. The patent for the "Separable Fastener" was issued in 1917. Gideon Sundbäck also created the manufacturing machine for the new device. The "S-L" or "strapless" machine took a special Y-shaped wire and cut scoops from it, then punched the scoop dimple and nib, and clamped each scoop on a cloth tape to produce a continuous zipper chain. Within the first year of operation, Sundbäck's machinery was producing a few hundred feet (around 100 meters) of fastener per day. In March of the same year, Mathieu Burri, a Swiss inventor, improved the design by adding a lock-in system attached to the last teeth, but his version never got into production due to conflicting patents.

In 1923, during a trip to Europe, Sundbäck sold his European rights to Martin Othmar Winterhalter, who improved the design by using ribs and grooves instead of Sundbäck's joints and jaws and started producing with his company Riri on a large scale first in Germany, then in Switzerland.

Zipper slider brings together the two sides of teeth

The popular North American term zipper (UK zip, or occasionally zip-fastener) came from the B. F. Goodrich Company in 1923. The company used Gideon Sundbäck's fastener on a new type of rubber boots (or galoshes) and referred to it as the zipper, and the name stuck. The two chief uses of the zipper in its early years were for closing boots and tobacco pouches. Zippers began being used for clothing in 1925 by Schott NYC on leather jackets.

In the 1930s, a sales campaign began for children's clothing featuring zippers. The campaign praised zippers for promoting self-reliance in young children by making it possible for them to dress themselves. The zipper beat the button in 1937 in the "Battle of the Fly", after French fashion designers raved over zippers in men's trousers. A Talon advertisement in the first Esquire magazine declared the zipper the "Newest Tailoring Idea for Men", and that among the zippered fly's many virtues was that it would exclude "The Possibility of Unintentional and Embarrassing Disarray."

A later innovation in the zipper's design was the introduction of models that could open on both ends, as on jackets. The zipper has become by far the most widespread fastener, and is used on clothing, luggage, leather goods, and various other objects.

== Types ==
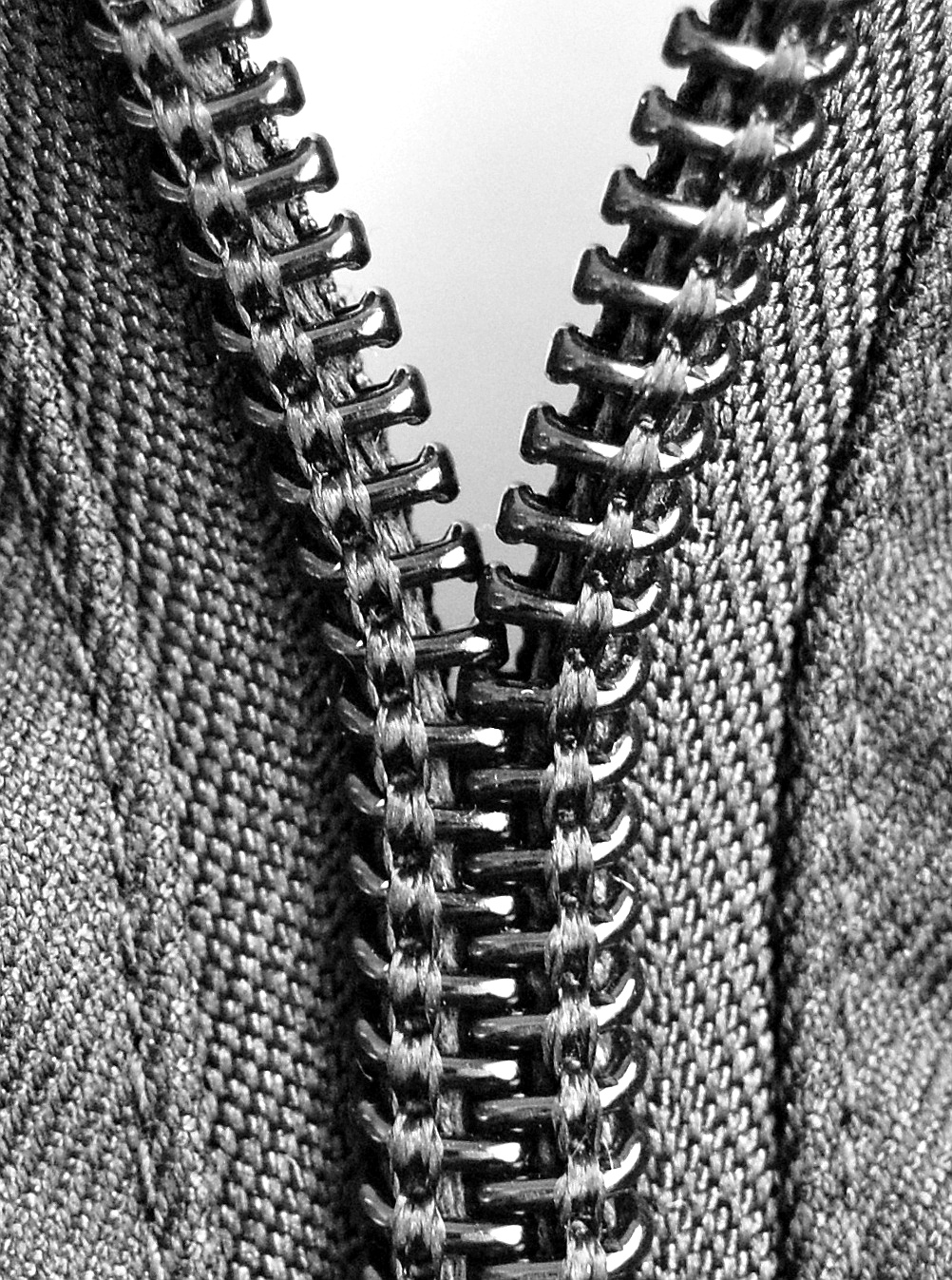
A coil zipper with its slider removed

- Coil zippers now form the bulk of sales of zippers worldwide. The slider runs on two coils on each side; the teeth are formed by the windings of the coils. Two basic types of coils are used: one with coils in spiral form, usually with a cord running inside the coils; the other with coils in ladder form, also called the Ruhrmann type. Coil zippers are made of polyester coil and are thus also termed polyester zippers. Nylon was formerly used to make them, and though only polyester is used now, the type is still also termed a nylon zipper.
- Invisible zippers have the teeth hidden behind a tape, so that the zipper is invisible. It is also called the concealed zipper. The tape's color matches the garment's, as does the slider's and the puller's. This kind of a zipper is common in skirts and dresses. Invisible zippers are usually coil zippers. They are also seeing increased use by the military and emergency services because the appearance of a button down shirt can be maintained while providing a quick and easy fastening system. A regular invisible zipper uses a lighter lace-like fabric on the zipper tape, instead of the common heavier woven fabric on other zippers.
- Reverse coil zippers are a variation of the coil zipper. In a reverse coil zipper, the coil is on the reverse (back) side of the zipper and the slider works on the flat side of the zipper (normally the back, now the front). Unlike an invisible zipper where the coil is also on the back, the reverse coil shows stitching on the front side and the slider accommodates a variety of pulls (the invisible zipper requires a small, tear-drop pull due to the small slider attachment). Water resistant zippers are generally configured as reverse coil so that the PVC coating can cover the stitching. A rubber- or PVC-coated reverse zipper is called a waterproof zipper.
- Metal zippers are the classic zipper type, found mostly in jeans and pencil cases today. The teeth are not a coil, but are instead individual pieces of metal molded into shape and set on the zipper tape at regular intervals. Metal zippers are made with brass, aluminium and nickel. YKK pioneered development of the 56S aluminum alloy during 1958 even though specialist Japanese manufacturers failed to achieve it. The new metal material development brought forth substantial technological progress for zipper manufacturing. The product development of concealed zippers led YKK both in international market penetration of this product line as well as opening opportunities for aluminum architectural products sales. All these zippers are basically made from flat wire. A special type of metal zipper is made from pre-formed wire, usually brass, but sometimes other metals, too. Only a few companies in the world have this technology. This type of pre-formed metal zipper is mainly used in high grade jeans-wear, work-wear, etc., where high strength is required and zippers need to withstand tough washing.
- Plastic-molded zippers are identical to metallic zippers, except that the teeth are plastic instead of metal. Metal zippers can be painted to match the surrounding fabric; plastic zippers can be made in any color of plastic. Plastic zippers mostly use polyacetal resin, though other thermoplastic polymers are used as well, such as polyethylene. Used most popularly for pencil cases, small plastic pouches and other stationery.
- Open-ended zippers use a box and pin mechanism to lock the two sides of the zipper into place, often in jackets. Open-ended zippers can be of any of the above described types.
- Two way open-ended zippers have a puller on each end of the zipper tape instead of having an insertion pin and pin box at the bottom. Someone wearing a garment with this kind of zipper can slide up the bottom puller to accommodate more leg movement without stressing the pin and box of a one-way open-ended zipper. It is most commonly used on long coats.
- Two way closed-ended zippers are closed at both ends; they are often used in luggage and can have either one or two pullers on the zipper.
- Magnetic zippers allow for one-handed closure and are used in sportswear.
- YKK announced in 2025 that it had developed a tapeless zipper, where the teeth structure is attached direct to the garment fabric, and claimed it was more flexible and more environmentally friendly due to using fewer materials. Activewear brands Descente and The North Face were early adopters.
- The three-sided zipper or Y-zipper is a design that has been prototyped but is not in common use. It was invented in 1985 by William T. Freeman and revisited forty years later by a team from MIT Computer Science and Artificial Intelligence Laboratory, who showed that the design was easily 3D-printable. It consists of three strips which zip together to form a rigid spar. The researchers suggested the design could be beneficial for structures that need to go from soft to rigid and back, such as tents and some forms of medical support.

=== Air and water tightness ===
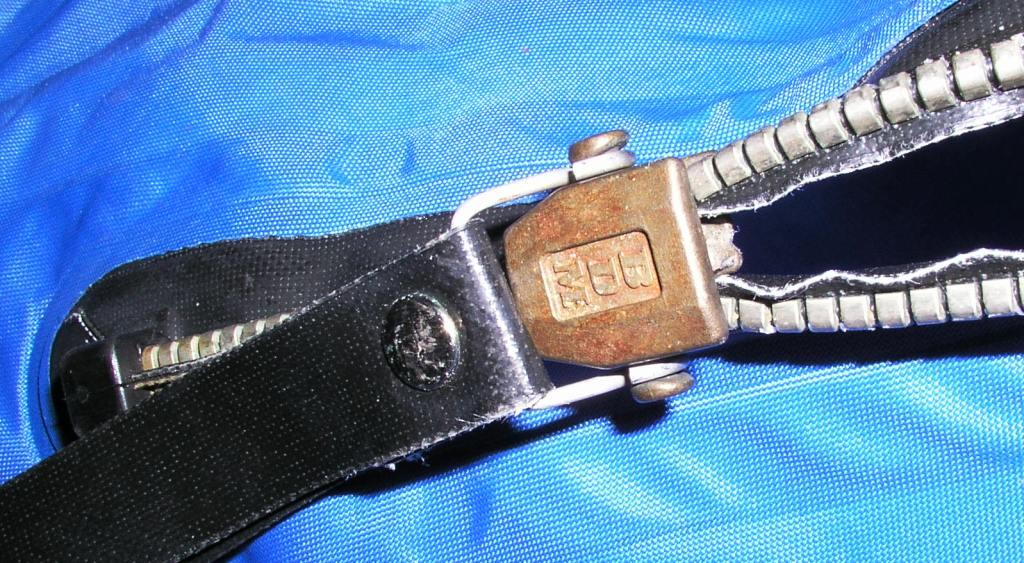
Waterproof zipper on a diving dry suit. The exterior metal segments clamp the waterproof sheeting over the concealed zipper teeth. The zipper teeth are not visible in this image (obscured by the edges of the waterproof sheet).

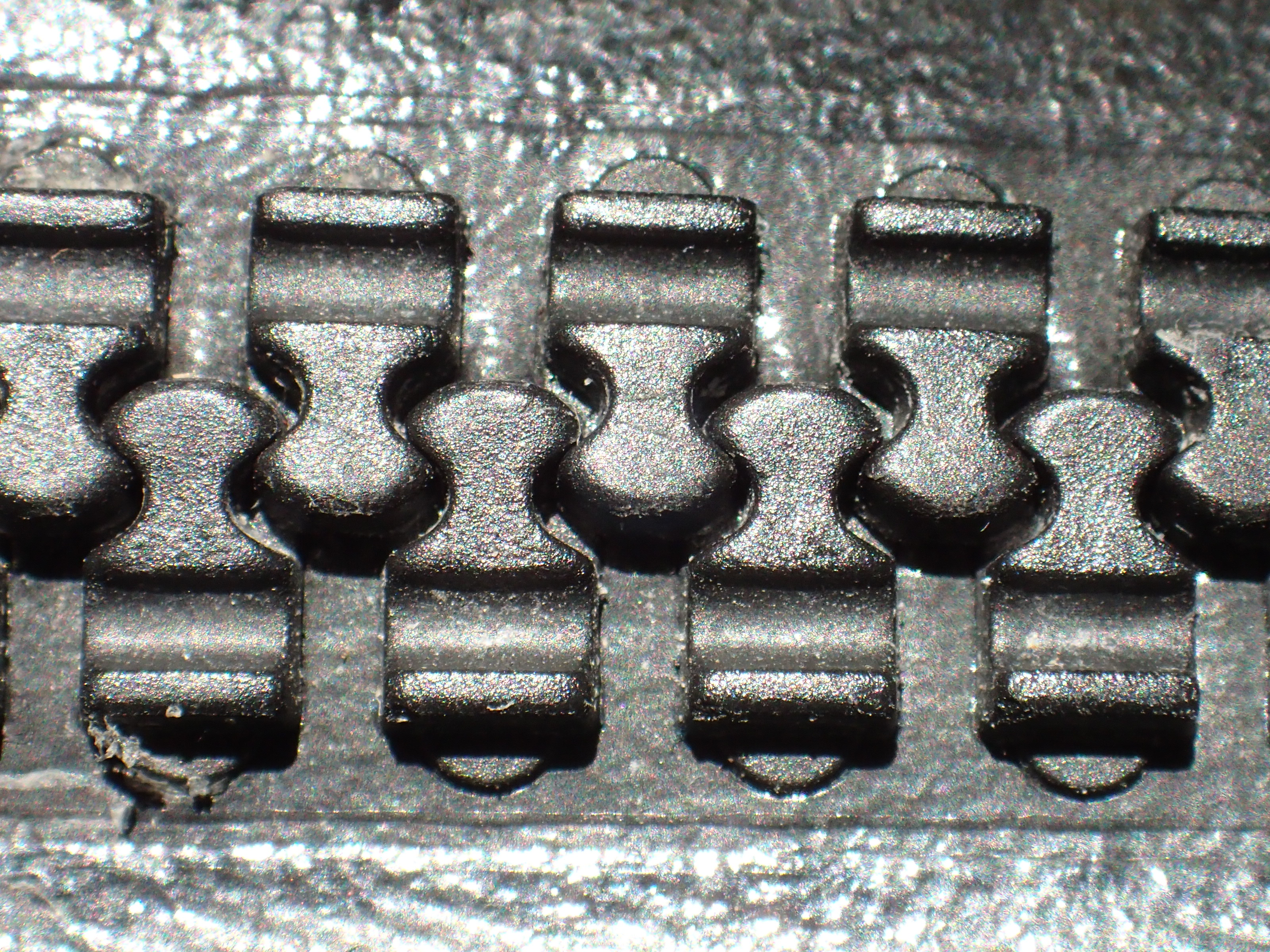
Plastic watertight drysuit zipper closed teeth detail

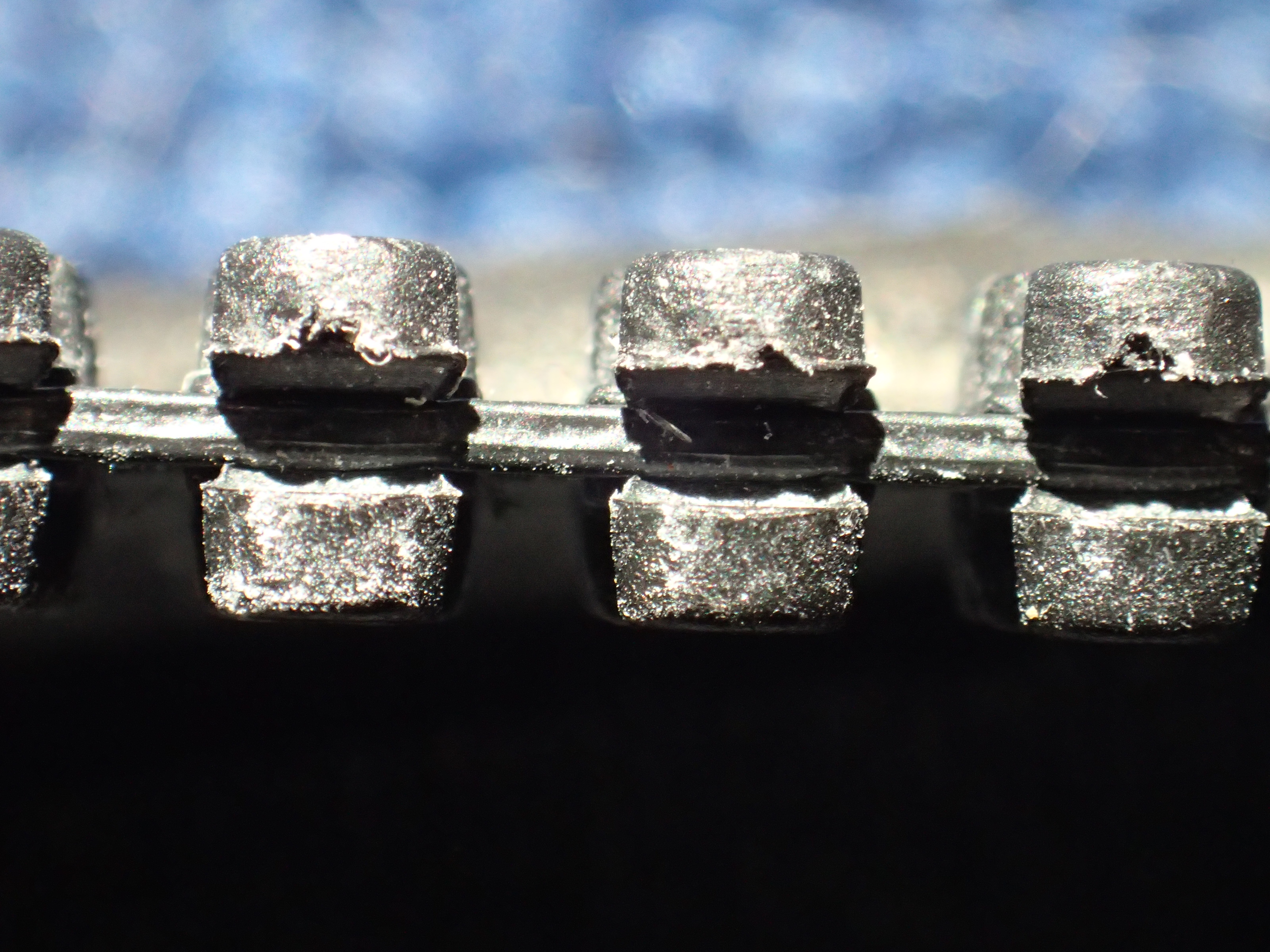
Plastic watertight drysuit zipper tooth and seal edge detail

Airtight zippers were first developed by NASA for making high-altitude pressure suits and later space suits, capable of retaining air pressure inside the suit in the vacuum of space.

The airtight zipper is built like a standard toothed zipper, but with a waterproof sheeting (which is made of fabric-reinforced polyethylene and is bonded to the rest of the suit) wrapped around the outside of each row of zipper teeth. When the zipper is closed, the two facing sides of the plastic sheeting are squeezed tightly against one another (between the C-shaped clips) both above and below the zipper teeth, forming a double seal.

This double-mated surface is good at retaining both vacuum and pressure, but the fit must be very tight to press the surfaces together firmly. Consequently, these zippers are typically very stiff when zipped shut and have minimal flex or stretch. They are hard to open and close because the zipper anvil must bend apart teeth that are being held under tension. They can also be derailed, causing damage to the sealing surfaces, if the teeth are misaligned while straining to pull the zipper shut.

These zippers are very common where airtight or watertight seals are needed, such as on scuba diving dry suits, ocean survival suits, and hazmat suits.

A less common water-resistant zipper is similar in construction to a standard toothed zipper, but includes a molded plastic ridge seal similar to the mating surfaces on a Ziploc bag. Such a zipper is easier to open and close than a clipped version, and the slider has a gap above the zipper teeth for separating the ridge seal. This seal is structurally weak against internal pressure, and can be separated by pressure within the sealed container pushing outward on the ridges, which simply flex and spread apart, potentially allowing air or liquid entry. Ridge-sealed zippers are sometimes used on lower-cost surface dry suits.

== Anti-slide zipper locks ==
Some zippers include a designed ability for the slider to hold in a steady open or closed position, resisting forces that would try to move the slider and open the zipper unexpectedly. There are two common ways this is accomplished:

The zipper handle can have a short protruding pin stamped into it, which inserts between the zipper teeth through a hole on the slider, when the handle is folded down flat against the zipper teeth. This appears on some brands of trousers. The handle of the fly zipper is folded flat against the teeth when it is not in use, and the handle is held down by both slider hinge tension and the fabric flap over the fly.

The slider can also have a two-piece hinge assembly attaching the handle to the slider, with the base of the hinge under spring tension and with protruding pins on the bottom that insert between the zipper teeth. To move the zipper, the handle is pulled outward against spring tension, lifting the pins out from between the teeth as the slider moves. When the handle is released the pins automatically engage between the zipper teeth again. They are called "auto-lock sliders".

A three-piece version of the above uses a tiny pivoting arm held under tension inside the hinge. Pulling on the handle from any direction lifts the pivoting arm's pins out of the zipper teeth so that the slider can move.

== Components ==
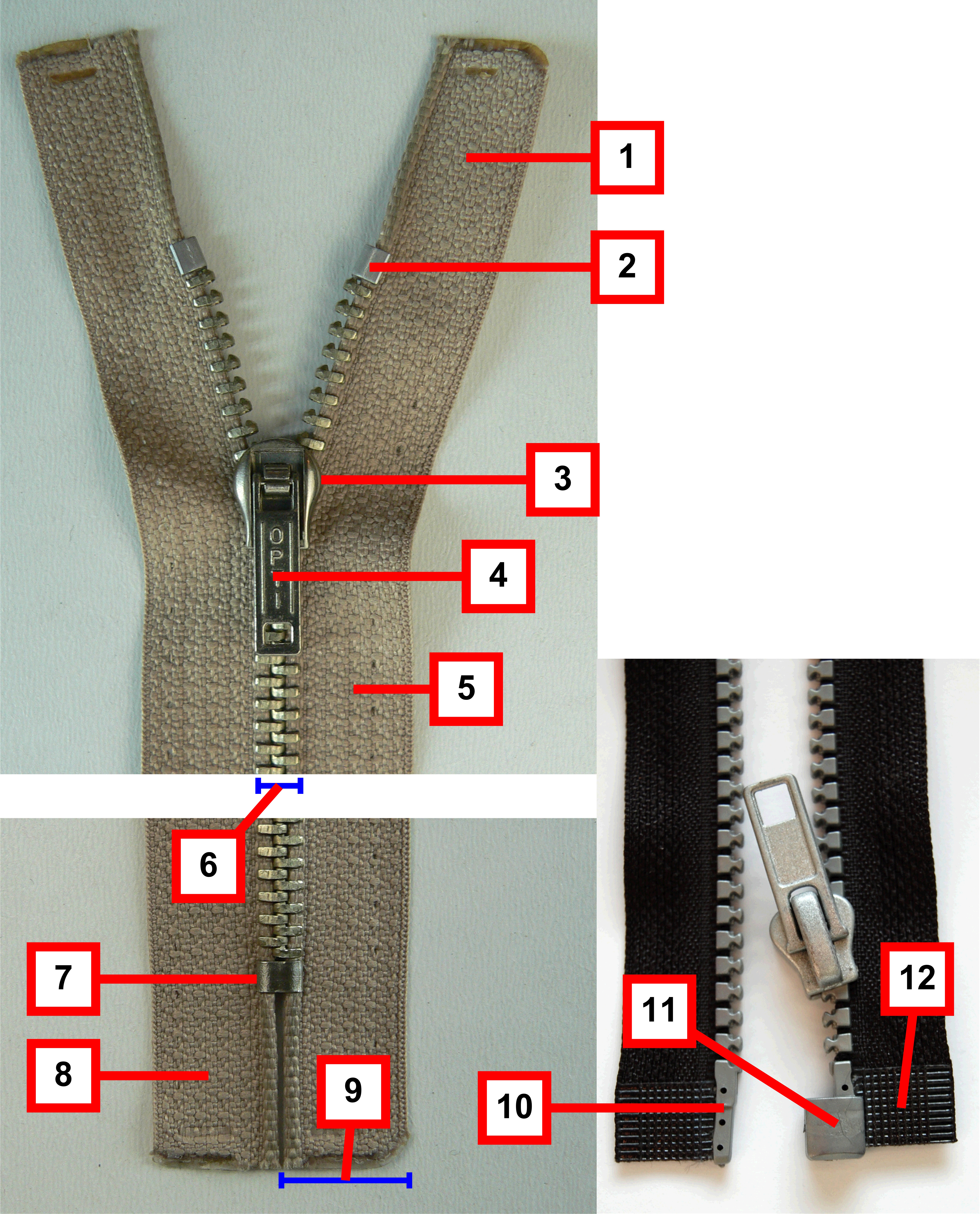
Components of a zipper

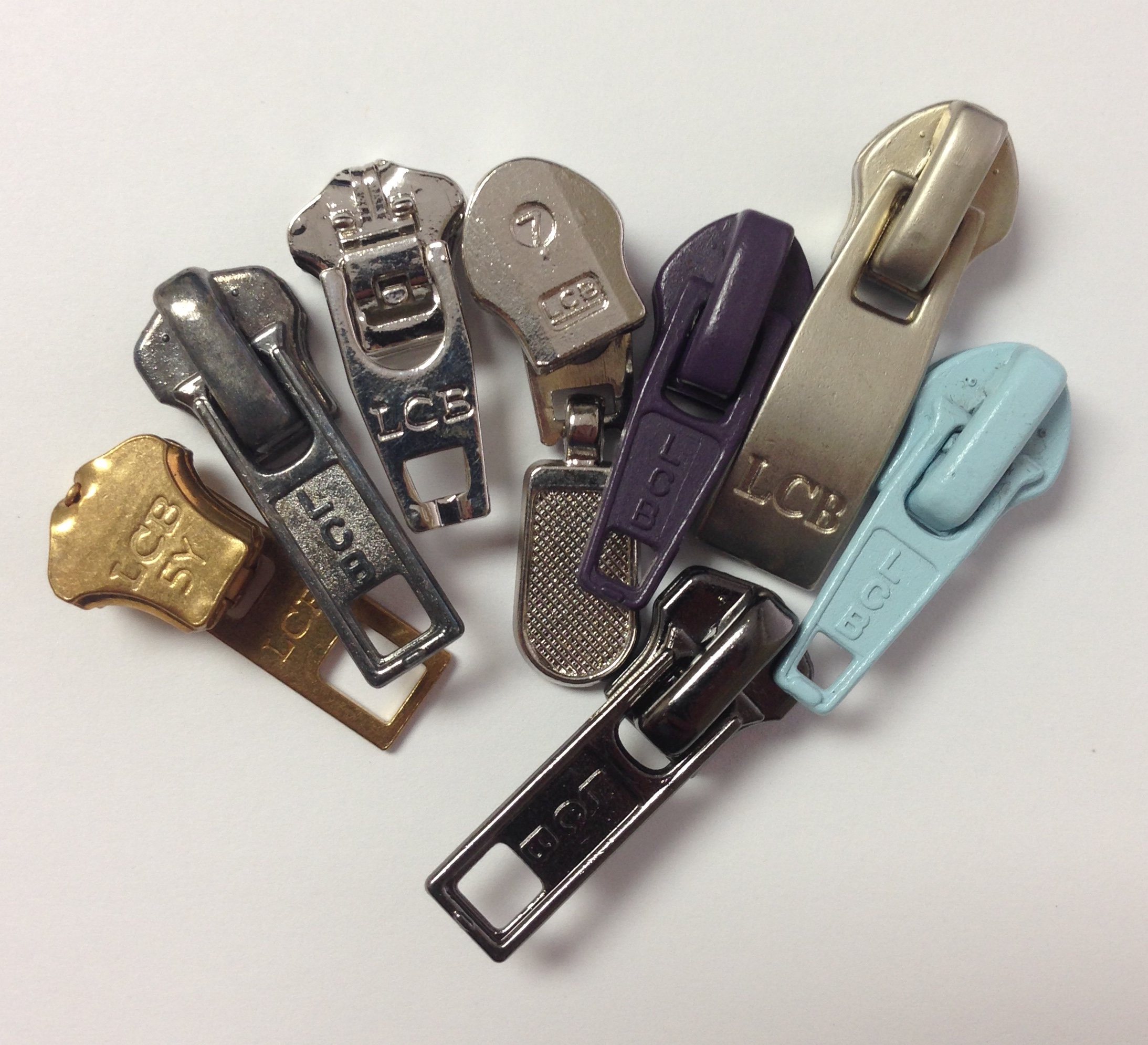
Different types of zipper pullers and sliders

The components of a zipper are:

1. Top Tape Extension (the fabric part of the zipper, that extends beyond the teeth, at the top of the chain)
2. Top Stop (two devices affixed to the top end of a zipper, to prevent the slider from coming off the chain)
3. Slider (the device that moves up and down the chain to open or close the zipper)
4. Pull Tab or Puller (the part of the slider that is held to move the slider up or down)
5. Tape Width (refers to the width of the fabric on both sides of the zipper chain)
6. Chain or Zipper Teeth (the continuous piece that is formed when both halves of a zipper are meshed together) and Chain Width (refers to the specific gauge of the chain – common gauge sizes are #3, #5, #7, #8 and #10, the bigger the number, the wider the teeth/chain width is)
7. Bottom Stop (a device affixed to the bottom end of a zipper, to prevent further movement of the half of the zipper from separating)
8. Bottom Tape Extension (the fabric part of the zipper, that extends beyond the teeth, at the bottom of the chain)
9. Single Tape Width (refers to the width of the fabric on one side of the zipper chain)
10. Insertion Pin (a device used on a separating zipper whose function is to allow the joining of the two zipper halves)
11. Retainer Box or Pin Box (a device used on a separating zipper whose function is to correctly align the pin, to begin the joining of the zipper halves)
12. Reinforcement Film (a strip of plastic fused to each half of the zipper tape to allow a manufacturer to electronically "weld" the zipper onto the garment or item that is being manufactured, without the need of sewing or stitching)

== Manufacturing ==
Forbes reported in 2003 that although the zipper market in the 1960s was dominated by Talon Zipper (US) and Optilon (Germany), Japanese manufacturer YKK grew to become the industry giant by the 1980s. YKK held 45 percent of world market share, followed by Optilon (8 percent) and Talon Zipper (7 percent). YKK enters zipper historical records only following the significant contributions from Howe, Judson, Sundback and the B.F. Goodrich Company. Tadao Yoshida founded San-es Shokai as a zipper processing and selling company in Tokyo Japan in January 1934. During 1938 he constructed his first industrial facility located in Tokyo. The Great Tokyo Air Raids burned down the plant in March 1945 leading to a decision to reconstruct operations in Uozu where Yoshida Tadao and his family members and staff had fled for safety. Under the name "Yoshida Kogyo Kabushiki Kaisha" (YKK) he began his fresh start at the end of the war.

Tex Corp (India) has also emerged as a significant supplier to the apparel industry.

In Europe, the Cremalleras Rubi company was established in 1926 in Spain. It sold over 30 million zippers in 2012. YKK began to develop factory-made machinery independently and created the CM3 machine in 1959 with punching and alternating fixing features. After 1964 the company developed the CM6 that became a world leader for mass production quality capability. YKK established stable production of high-quality zippers at low prices after the CM6 development.

In 2005, The Guardian reported that China had 80 percent of the international market. Most of its product is made in Qiaotou, Yongjia County.

== U.S. patents ==
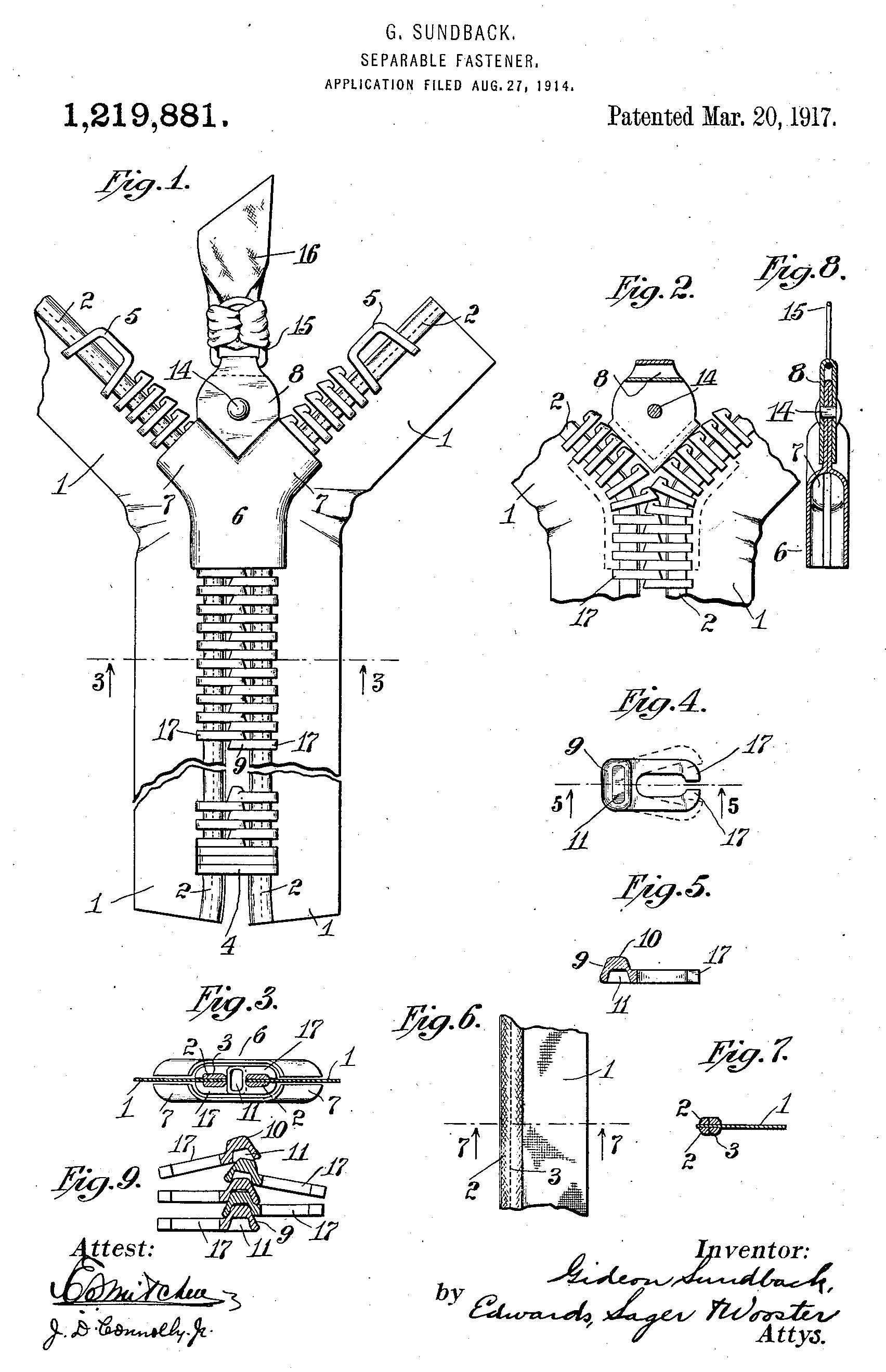

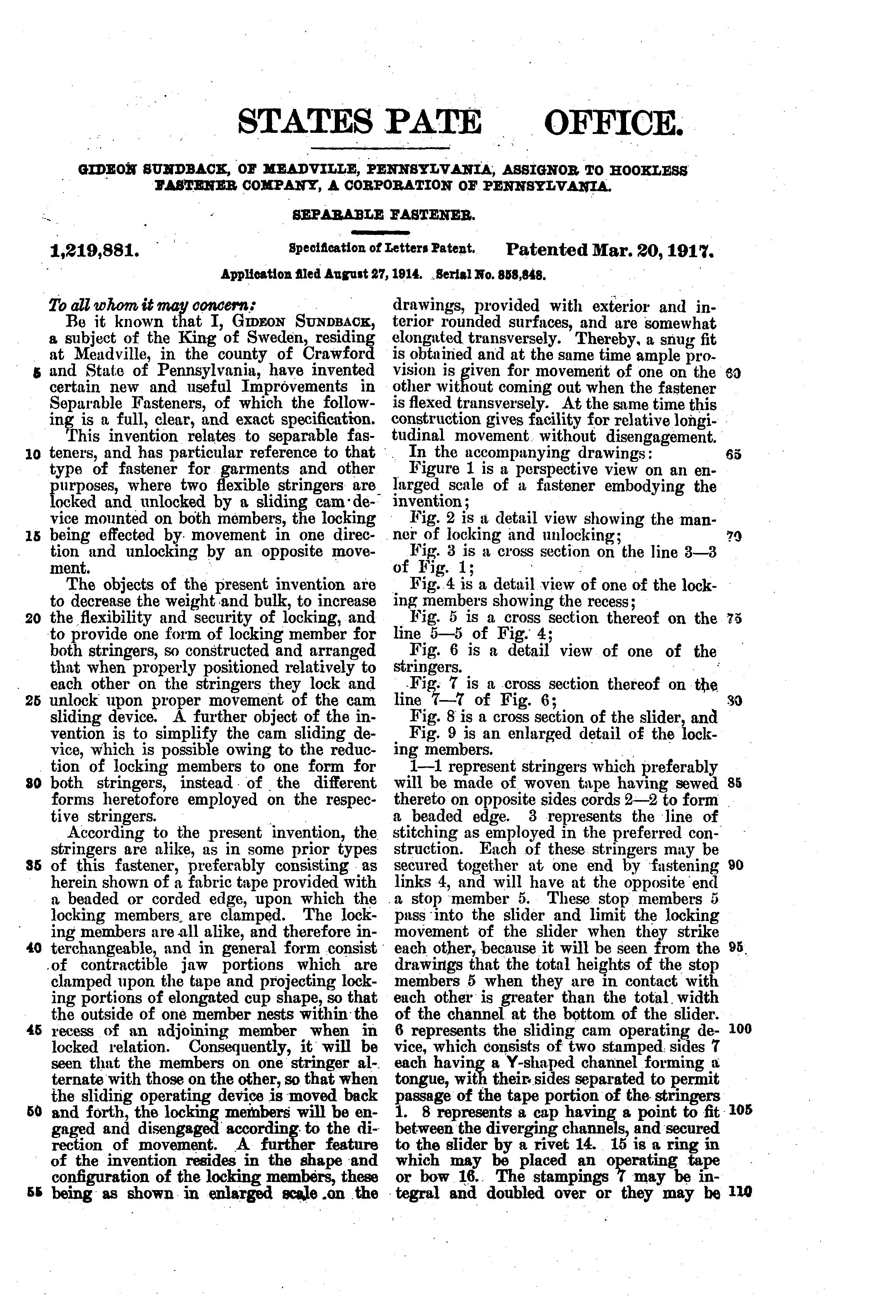

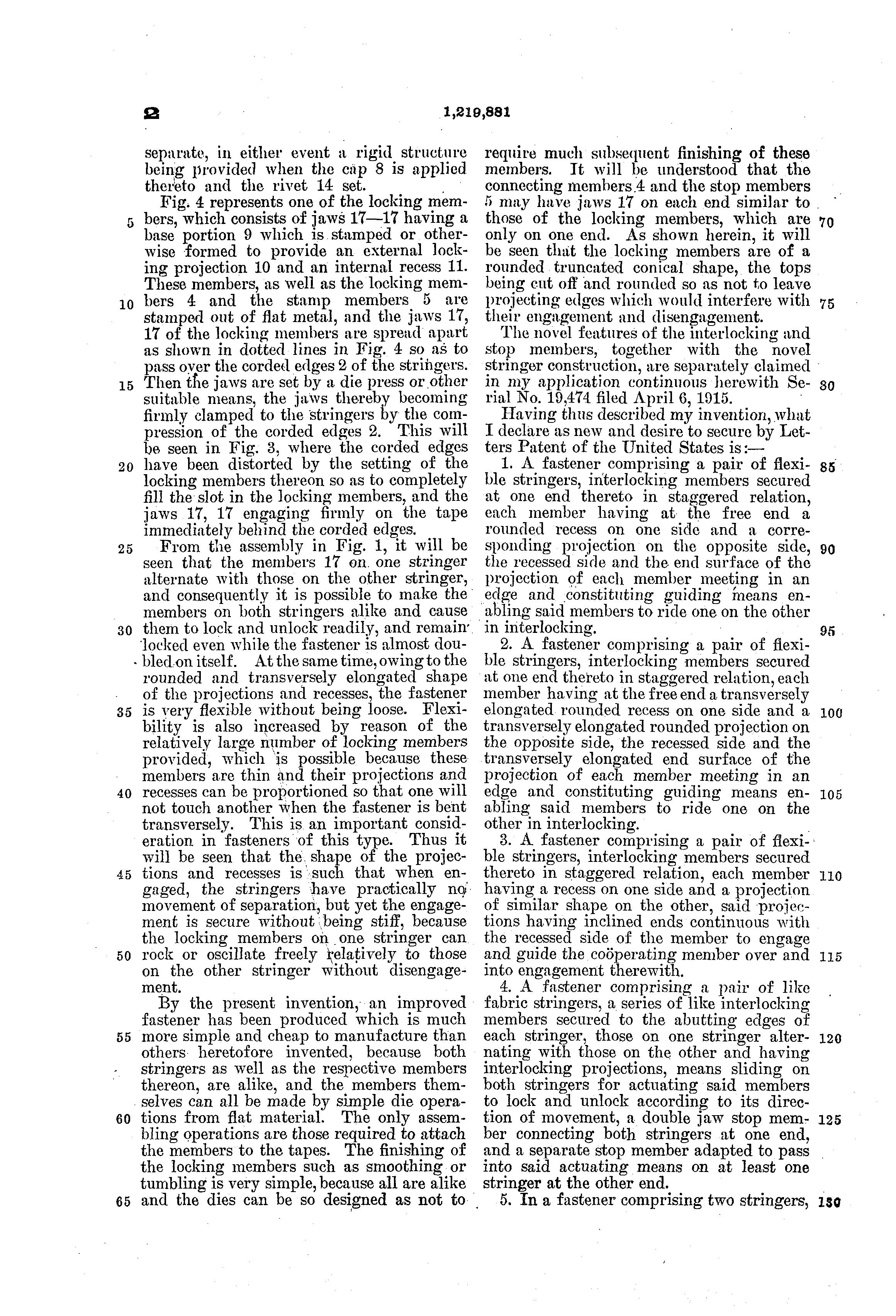

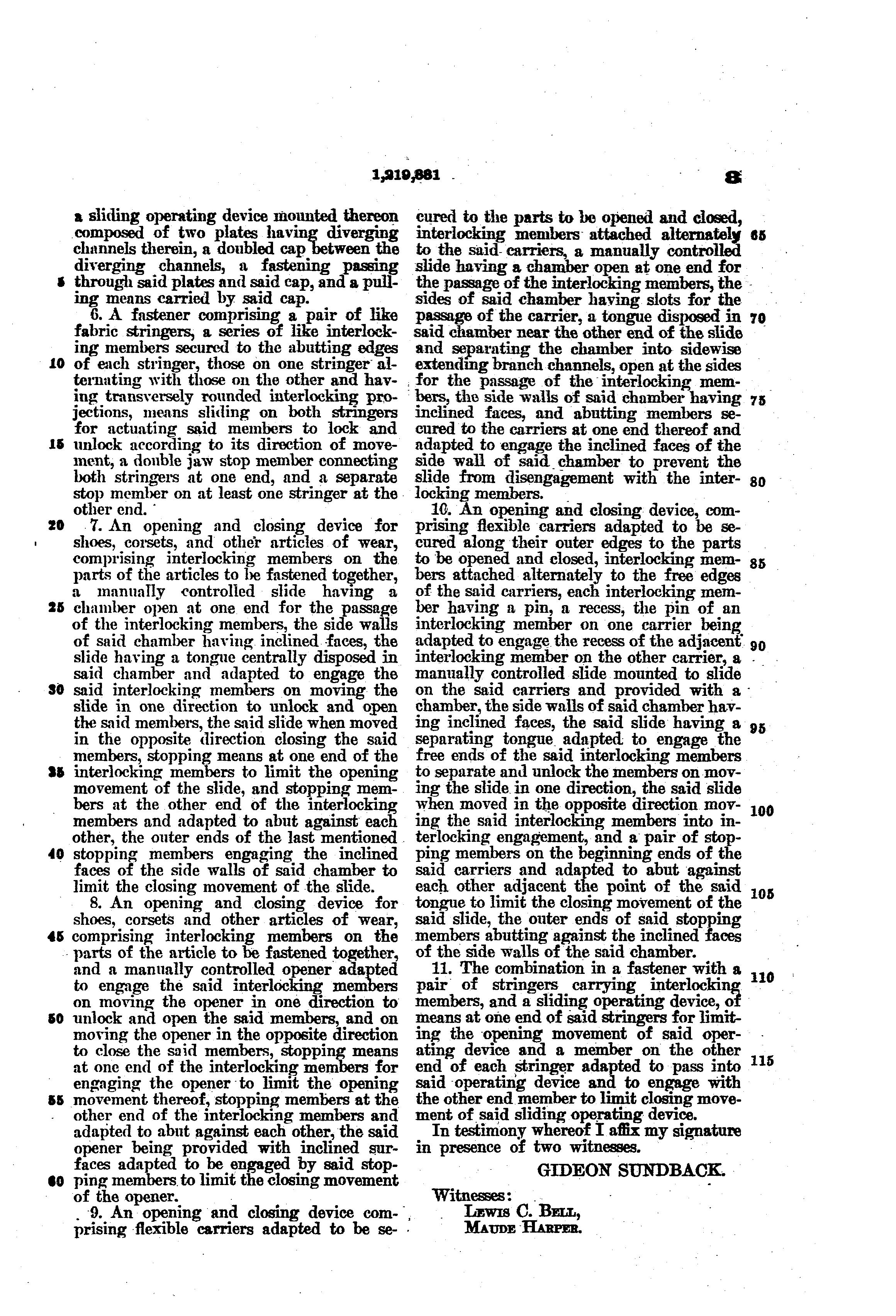

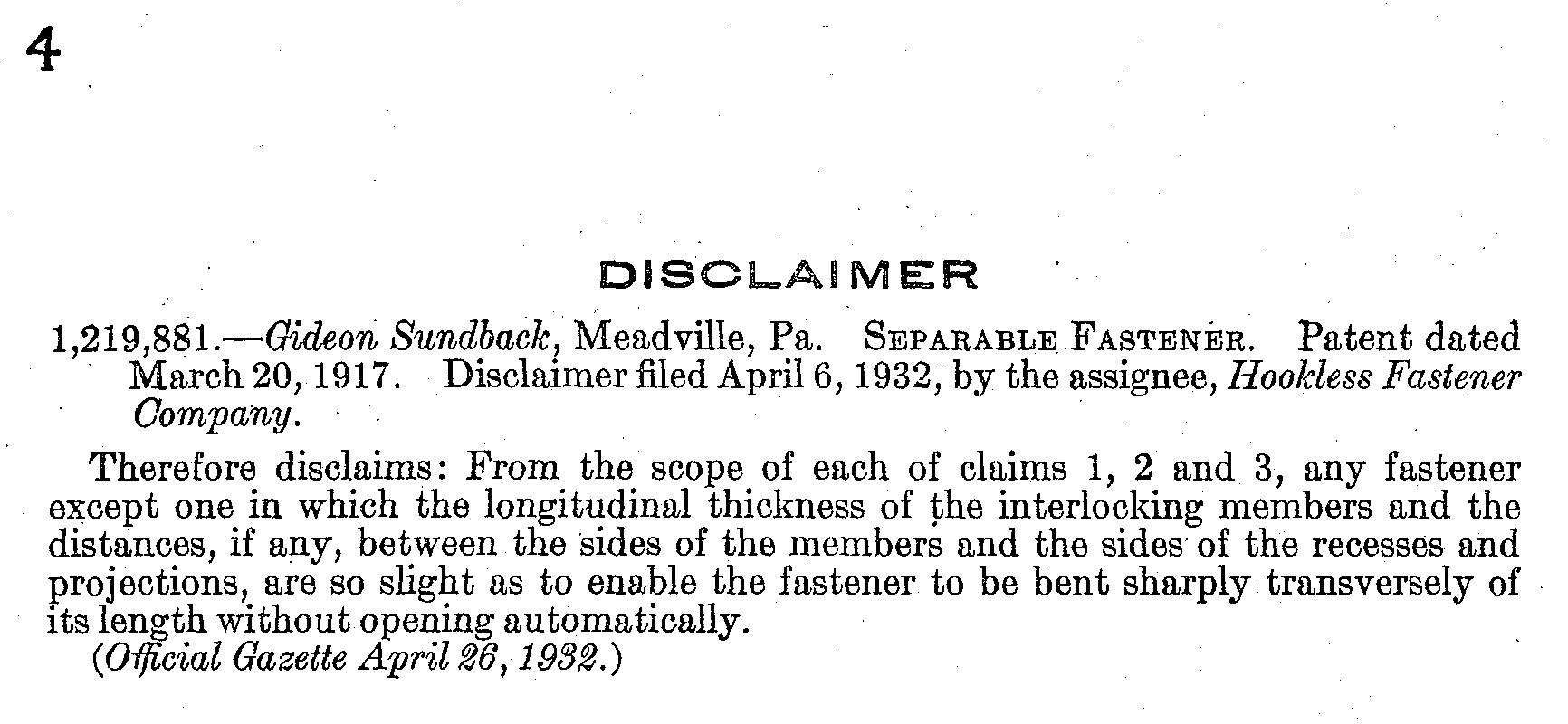
- 25 November 1851 U.S. patent 8,540: "Improvement in Fastening for Garments"
- 29 August 1893 U.S. patent 504,037: "Shoe fastening"
- 29 August 1893 U.S. patent 504,038: "Clasp Locker or Unlocker for Shoes"
- 31 March 1896 U.S. patent 557,207: "Fastening for Shoes"
- 31 March 1896 U.S. patent 557,208: "Clasp-Locker for Shoes"
- 29 April 1913 U.S. patent 1,060,378: "Separable fastener" (Gideon Sundback)
- 20 March 1917 U.S. patent 1,219,881: "Separable fastener" (Gideon Sundback)
- 22 December 1936 U.S. patent 2,065,250: "Slider"

== Mechanism ==
From U.S. patent 1,219,881, the following mechanism of the zipper improved by Gideon Sundback in 1917 is explained:

The locking members are all alike, and therefore interchangeable, and in general form consist of contractible jaw portions which are clamped upon the tape and projecting locking portions of elongated cup shape, so that the outside of one member nests within the recess of an adjoining member when in locked relation. Consequently, it will be seen that the members on one stringer alternate with those on the other, so that when the sliding operating device is moved back and forth, the locking members will be engaged and disengaged according to the direction of movement. A further feature of the invention resides in the shape and configuration of the locking members ... [they are] provided with exterior and interior rounded surfaces, and are somewhat elongated transversely. Thereby, a snug fit is obtained and at the same time ample provision is given for movement of one on the other without coming out when the fastener is flexed transversely. At the same time this construction gives facility for relative longitudinal movement, without disengagement.

The zipper is analogous in function to a drawstring, but different in mechanism. A drawstring works by tension in the string drawing the eyelets of the piece together, since the tension acts to straighten the string and forces the eyelets toward a line. The zipper works by an elastic, that is, reversible, deformation of the "locking members" (teeth). The zipper teeth are shaped and sized so that the forces which act on the zipper when the garment it is sewn on is worn cannot unlock the teeth. The slider constrains the teeth positions, moves them along a given path, and acts on the teeth one-by-one in its "Y-shaped channel", and so, can reversibly lock and unlock them. This is a lock and key design. In Sundback's invention the teeth are symmetric with "exterior and interior rounded surfaces" that are "elongated transversely". The teeth have a material part ("external projection") and a space ("internal recess"). The material part of one tooth is slightly smaller than the space on the other and so shaped to act as a "contractible jaw"—the jaw is elastically opened and then closed as it goes over the other tooth. The "snug fit" that results when "one member nests within the recess of an adjoining member" is a stable locked state. The maximum force when the slider operates is in between the unlocked and locked positions, giving two stable mechanical equilibria. The "snug fit" is stable, not only to forces from wear that act in the same direction as those of the slider, but also to transverse and longitudinal (both perpendicular) forces.

The zipper is analogous in mechanism to a bobby pin, where the person's hand slides hair into and out of the pin's "contractible jaw".

== In popular culture ==
Zippers have entered into urban legends. American folklorist Jan Brunvand noted that "The zipper has been the subject of jokes and legends since... the 1920s". Those stories reflect "modern anxieties and desires", emphasizing embarrassments and accidents, primarily involving the flies of men's trousers in stories such as "The Unzipped Stranger" and "The Unzipped Fly".

In Brave New World, Aldous Huxley repeatedly mentioned zippers, implying that, in their newness (as of the early 1930s), mechanical complexity, ease of use, and speed, zippers were somehow corrosive of natural human values.

== Durability and repairs ==
The zipper is often the least durable component in any garment or type of equipment. Most often, the zipper fails to close due to a worn or bent slider not being able to apply the necessary force to the sides of the teeth to cause them to interlock. This problem can sometimes be redressed by using small pliers to carefully squeeze the back part of the slider together a fraction of a millimeter. This can compensate for the wear of the slider. The slider is typically made as a magnesium diecast which breaks easily. It is necessary to reduce the force on the pliers before it can be felt that the slider actually gives in. If it is not yet possible to successfully close the zipper, the pressure applied to the slider should only gradually be increased. Another way to reduce the gap of the open end of the slider is by preparing a small block of wood by sawing a slot into one end so that it fits over the upper arm of the slider. Then a hammer can be used to exact a force onto the slider by carefully hitting the wood.

When the protective coating of the diecast slider has been worn off by prolonged use, the material can corrode. The corrosion products are usually metal salts which can accumulate and block the slider from moving. When this happens, the salt can often be dissolved by submerging the slider in vinegar or another mild acid. Otherwise, the slider needs to be removed and replaced.

== See also ==
- Talon Zipper the first manufacturer of hookless fasteners a/k/a zippers
- Funicular—A "zipper train" is a type of funicular train, sometimes called "cremallera" in Spanish
- Zipper storage bag

== Continue reading ==
- Petroski, Henry (1992). The Evolution of Useful Things. New York: Alfred A. Knopf. ISBN 0-679-74039-2.
- Friedel, Robert (1996). Zipper: An Exploration in Novelty. New York: W. W. Norton and Company. ISBN 0-393-31365-4.
