= Whitcomb L. Judson =

American inventor (1843–1909)

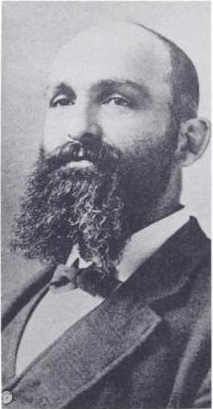
- Born: March 7, 1843; Chicago, Illinois, U.S.
- Died: December 7, 1909 (aged 66)
- Resting place: Muskegon, Michigan, U.S.
- Occupations: Salesman, engineer, inventor
- Known for: Inventor of zipper
- Spouse: Annie Martin (m. 1874)
- Children: 3

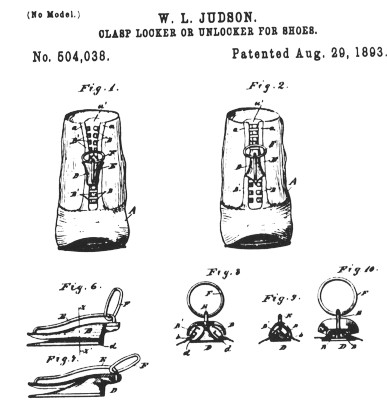
Judson's original 'clasp locker' patent, 1893

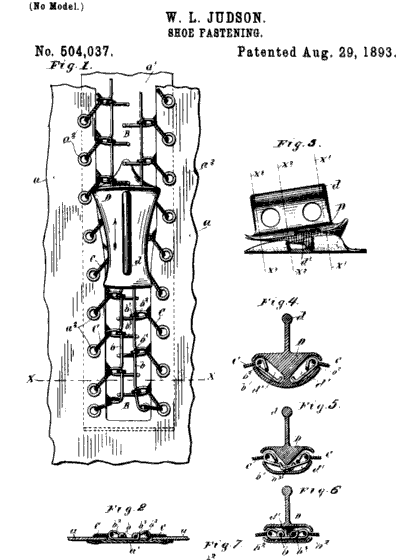
Judson's improved 'clasp-locker' fastener, 1893

Whitcomb L. Judson (March 7, 1843 – December 7, 1909) was an American machine salesman, mechanical engineer and inventor. He received thirty patents over a sixteen-year career, fourteen of which were on pneumatic street railway innovations. Six of his patents had to do with a motor mechanism suspended beneath the rail-car that functioned with compressed air. He founded the Judson Pneumatic Street Railway.

Judson is most noted for his invention of the zip fastener. It was originally called a clasp-locker. The first application was as a fastener for shoes and high boots. The patent said it could be used wherever it was desirable to connect a pair of adjacent flexible parts that could be detached easily. Possible applications noted were for corsets, gloves, and mail bags.

== Early life ==
Judson was born March 7, 1843, in Chicago, Illinois. He served in the Union Army and enlisted in 1861 at Oneida, Illinois, in the 42nd Illinois Infantry Regiment according to the Illinois State Archives. (Note: Historian Friedel says (the Forty-second Illinois Calvary)) Judson attended Knox College in his hometown Galesburg, Illinois. He was found in Minneapolis, Minnesota, in 1886. In 1886 and 1887 the Minneapolis city directory identified Judson as a "traveling agent" – a traveling salesman working probably for Pitts Agricultural Works. A couple of years later Judson began working for Earle Manufacturing Company with Harry L. Earle as the head of the firm. Judson sold band cutters and grain scales for them along with other items as one of their salesmen.

== Career ==
=== Street railway ===
Judson began his efforts of making inventions around 1888 to 1889. His concentration was on inventions for a "pneumatic street railway". His first patented invention was for a "mechanical movement" related to that. In 1889, Judson obtained six patents related to his concept of a street railway running on compressed air. The concept was similar to the cable railway system but with pistons suspended beneath the rail-car. Judson received a total of 14 patents related to this type of railway system out of the 30 patents he had.

Similar systems were tried throughout the nineteenth century, however, they all failed because of sealing problems. Judson's similar inventions were also impractical and as a whole not very successful. The street railway concept ultimately went electric. Judson Pneumatic Street Railway was initiated by Judson and Earle was one of the promoters. It even had a demonstration line in 1890 in Washington, D.C., for about a mile that was at what is today Georgia Avenue. It ran for only a few weeks before the company shut it down due to technical problems. A cable streetcar firm bought them out and turned it into an electric streetcar since Judson's system was impractical.

=== Zipper ===
Judson's most noteworthy invention, a chain-lock fastener, was the precursor to the modern zipper which he developed and invented in 1891. Judson is generally recognized as the inventor of the zipper. He also invented a "clasp-locker" automation production machine that made his fastener device inexpensively. His metal zipper fastener device was actually called a "clasp-locker" in his time; the name "zipper" was not actually coined or used until many years after his death. The "clasp locker" was a complicated hook-and-eye fastener with an arrangement of hooks and eyes run by a "guide" for closing and opening a clothing item. The first application was as a shoe fastener, and there is mention in the patents for possible applications for corsets, gloves, mail bags, and "generally wherever it is desired to detachably connect a pair of adjacent flexible parts." It is also said one of the reasons he invented this device was to relieve the tedium of fastening high button boots that were fashionable in those days.

Judson's first slide fastener patent was applied for in November 1891. At the time the United States Patent Office no longer required a working model of a patent, only that the invention was to be a novel idea. However, his invention was almost rejected by the patent assistant examiner Thomas Hart Anderson because there were several types of shoe fasteners already patented. He applied for a second patent on an improved version for the same item some nine months later before the first was even approved.

The patent was approved in May 1893 after the last amendment was filed with an improved version. When the two patents were finally issued on August 29 (along with 378 others that day), they received the numbers U.S.P. 504,038 (first) and U.S.P. 504,037 (second). These patents describe several designs of the "clasp-locker". Later design patents of the fastener describe opposite elements on each side that are identical to each other and fit together by the engaging of "pintles" and "sockets." In his patent U.S.P. 557,207 of 1896 is a description mostly like the zipper of today.

... each link of each chain is provided both with a male and female coupling part, and when the chains are coupled together the female part of each link on one chain is engaged by the male part of a link on the other chain.

In 1893, Judson exhibited his new invention at the Chicago World's Fair where it had its debut. Judson launched the Universal Fastener Company to manufacture his new invention, together with Harry L. Earle and Lewis Walker. The Universal Fastener Company started out in Chicago and then moved to Elyria, Ohio. It then moved to Catasauqua, Pennsylvania, and then to Hoboken, New Jersey. The name changed eventually to Automatic Hook and Eye Company.

Judson's "clasp-locker" met with little commercial success at first. He ultimately never saw much success in the "clasp-locker" as a fashion item during his lifetime. Judson made a "C-curity" clasp-locker fastener in 1905 which was an improved version of his previous patents. It tended to break open unexpectedly like the predecessors. Clothing manufacturers showed little interest in Judson's fastener perhaps because of this reason.

An improved version of 1896 came with

a cam-action slider which is somewhat similar to the locker and unlocker shown in my prior patents, but which in this combination operates with a somewhat different action involving an automatic movement of the slider backward in the uncoupling action of the chains, and which slider is in this case designed to remain permanently on the shoe.

Judson made his invention to save people the trouble of buttoning and unbuttoning their shoes every day as shows in his wording in the patent application. He describes this in his patent U.S.P. 557,207

From the foregoing statements it must be obvious that a shoe equipped with my device has all the advantages peculiar to a lace-shoe, while at the same time it is free from the annoyances hitherto incidental to lace-shoes on account of the lacing and unlacing required every time the shoes were put on or taken off the feet and on account of the lacing-strings coming untied. With my device, the lacing-strings may be adjusted from time to time to take up the slack in the shoes, and the shoes may be fastened or loosened more quickly than any other form of shoe hitherto devised, so far as I am aware.

In 1913, the zipper was improved by the Swedish American engineer, Gideon Sundback, and also by Catharina Kuhn-Moos of Europe. Sundback successfully redesigned Judson's fastener into a more streamlined and reliable form called "Talon." Automatic Hook and Eye Company then changed its name to the Hookless Fastener Company. In 1937 the Hookless Fastener Company became Talon, Inc.

In 1918, a textile company manufactured flying suits for the United States Navy with this fastener. Judson's company received an order for thousands of their "clasp-locker" fasteners. Soon thereafter they appeared on gloves and tobacco pouches. The B. F. Goodrich company in 1923 installed these fasteners in their rubber galoshes, calling the new design "Zippers." This then became the name of the fastener itself. The design of the fastener today is much like Sundback's improvement of Judson's "clasp-locker."

== Personal life ==
Judson married his wife, Annie Martin, in 1874. They had three children: Jane, Gertrude, and Rossland. Rossland became vice-president of Continental Motor Manufacturing Company, which developed the first automobile hydraulic system co-innovated by Judson.

== Later life ==
Judson lived in New York City for the later part of his life. He moved in 1906 to Muskegon, Michigan. There he died at the age of 63 on December 7, 1909. The cause of death was stomach cancer.

== Sources ==
- Friedel, Robert, Zipper: An Exploration in Novelty, W. W. Norton & Company, 1996, ISBN 0-393-31365-4
- Leslie, Sarah et al., The World's Greatest Inventors, Platt & Munk, 1976, ISBN 0-448-49614-3
- Travers, Bridget World of Invention, Gale Research, 1994, ISBN 0-8103-8375-6
