= Talon Zipper =

Manufacturer of zippers

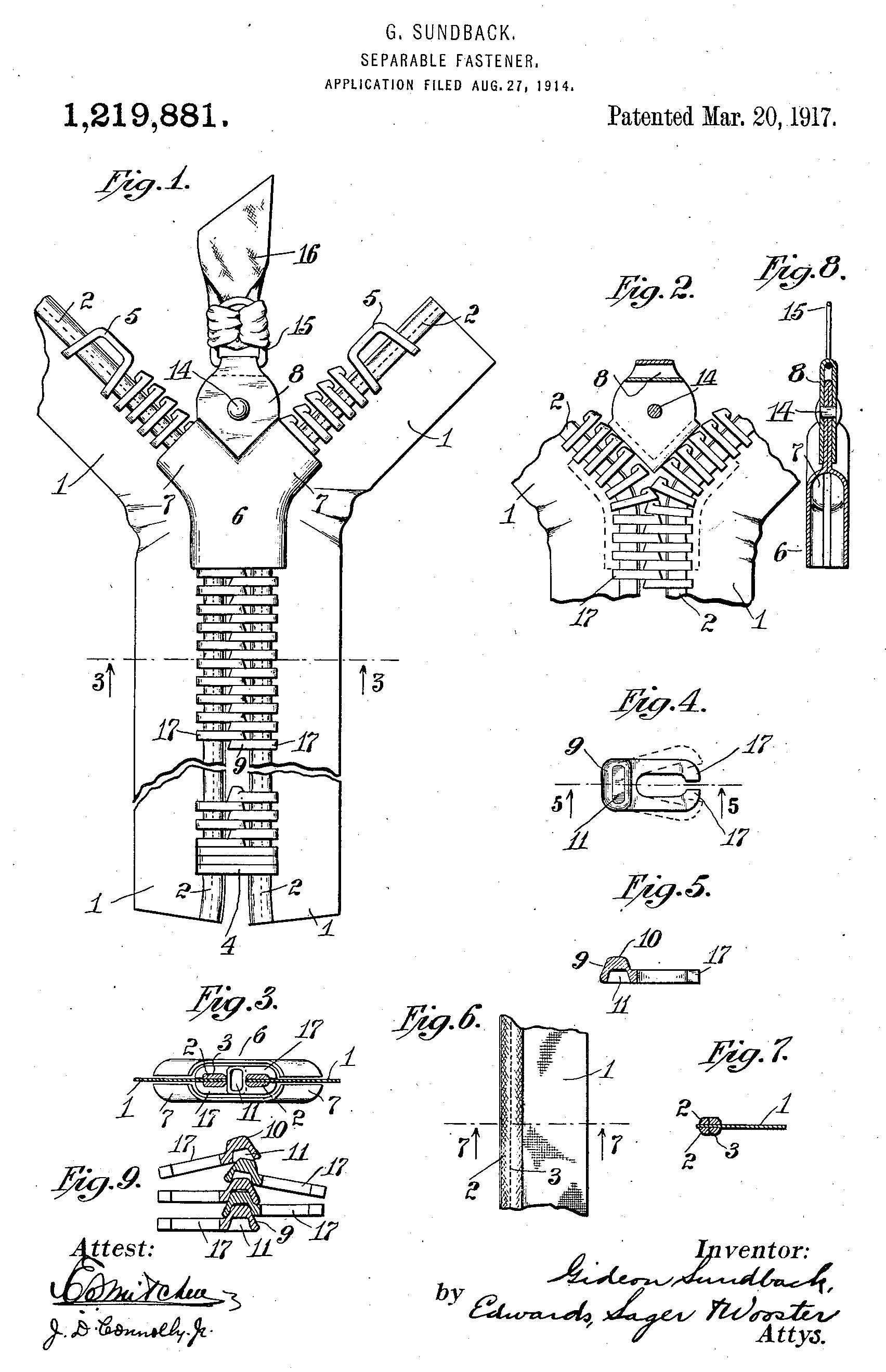
Drawing of 1917 slide fastener patent filing

Talon is the first slide fastener (or zipper) manufacturing company. It was founded in 1893 as the Universal Fastener Company, manufacturing hookless fasteners for shoes. In 1913, it moved to Meadville, Pennsylvania, becoming the first manufacturer of zippers. The company flourished through the 1960s when it is estimated that seven out of every 10 zippers were made by Talon.

== Business history ==
In 1891 Chicago inventor Whitcomb L. Judson wanted an easier way to lace up his shoes so he devised a system of hooks and eyes, plus a slide mechanism, to fasten and unfasten the hooks. He exhibited his device at the 1893 World's Columbian Exposition. Lewis Walker, a corporate attorney from Meadville, Pennsylvania, took an interest in the product. Lewis organized the Universal Fastening Company and became the major stockholder.

Judson's device, called the Clasp Locket, did not work well, and each hook and eye had to be hand-sewn onto the shoe or garment. In 1904, the company was reorganized as the Automatic Hook and Eye Company and was moved to New Jersey. Judson kept working to improve his invention, and in 1905, he came up with the C-Curity Placket Fastener, which had smaller hooks and eyes attached to strips of fabric. But the C-Curity fastener had to be removed from the garment before washing, so it was not popular. The inventor lost interest in fastener products.

In 1906, Lewis Walker hired engineer Gideon Sundback to work on improving C-Curity. Sundback made many innovations that brought it closer to modern-day zippers. He also developed the machinery needed to produce the parts.

=== Move to Meadville ===
In 1913 the company was reorganized once more, becoming the Hookless Fastener Company, and moved to Meadville, Pennsylvania. That same year Sundback developed Hookless No. 2, a fastener with small interlocking scoops, also called teeth, attached to cloth tapes. Two facing rows of scoops were pulled into one piece by means of a slider.

The new fastener worked well, but there were few sales until the United States entered World War I in 1917, and money belts, life vests and aviation suits were made with the units. In 1919 Locktite tobacco pouches began being made with zippers, and hundreds of thousands of the pouches were made, utilizing 70 percent of Hookless Fastener Company’s output.

=== Zipper name trademarked by Goodrich ===
In 1923 the B.F. Goodrich Company introduced a line of rubber galoshes that used slide fasteners instead of metal buckles. To emphasize how quickly the galoshes could be fastened they were marketed as Zipper Boots. The Goodrich company registered the trademark name Zipper in 1943, so that no other company could legally use the name, though individuals informally referred to slide fasteners as zippers. The trademark expired in 1986 and was not renewed, so it is now legal for other companies to call their products zippers.

=== Talon becomes new company name ===
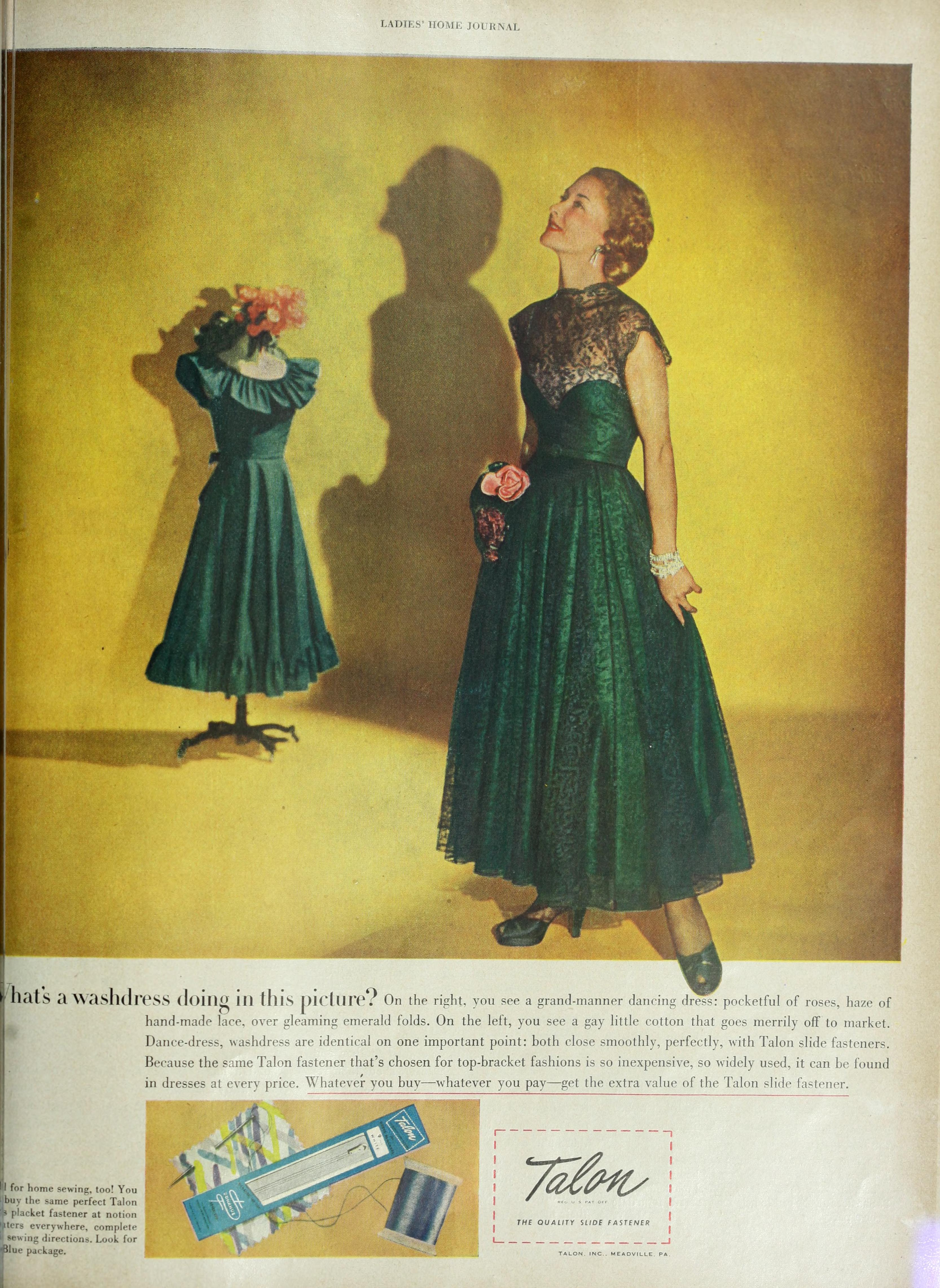
1948 Talon advertisement

In 1937 Lewis Walker died, leaving the Hookless Fastener Company to his sons. The business name was changed to Talon, referring to the claws, or talons, of birds of prey, such as eagles.

Talon flourished, and in 1940 the company had 6,700 employees – 4,200 in Meadville, 1,000 in nearby Erie, Pennsylvania, and 1,500 in other locations. Profits for the year were five million dollars. During World War II Talon received military contracts for zippers, plus parts for weapons, and for hypodermic needles.

In the decades immediately after the war Talon had such a need for trained tool and die makers that they started their own apprenticeship program, training approximately 50 apprentices at a time. The program led to Meadville becoming known as Tool City USA, for between 1945 and 1960 six former Talon apprentices started their own local tool making business. In 2003 there were more than 130 tooling and machine shops in Crawford County, where Meadville is the county seat.

In 1960 the Talon Zephyr, a zipper with a nylon filament coil construction, was introduced. It was half as wide as their smallest metal fastener, and was more flexible. By 1962 the Zephyr represented one-third of Talon’s 500 million unit sales. Talon acquired the Universal Button Company and began producing metal buttons, hooks and eyes, and snaps, though zippers continued to make up 80 percent of Talon’s sales.

Over time foreign competition eroded Talon’s profits. By the late 1970s the company's Meadville workforce had fallen to 500, and in 1991 there were only about 150 Meadville employees. To reduce costs plants were opened in North and South Carolina. Talon left Meadville, Pennsylvania in 1994.

=== United States manufacturing ends ===
In 1998 Talon became associated with Grupo Industrial Cierres Ideal, a Mexican conglomerate, and all United States manufacturing plants were closed. In 2001 Tag-It Pacific Inc founded by Harold and Colin Dyne Father and Son purchased the Talon brand name, and in 2007 the business changed its name to Talon International. Talon International now headed by Colin Dyne CEO expanded the business Manufacturing to Asia and became a global supplier focusing initially on the Brass formed wire Jean Zipper. Today Talon manufactures many types of closed and open end Zippers and holds numerous attachments patents. The company is led by CEO Larry Dyne the son of the late Harold Dyne and sibling to Colin Dyne .

== Current products ==
=== Zippers ===
- Metal
- Vintage Zips
- DrXTalon
- Bottom Jean Zippers
- Workwear : Work Zip
- FR Zip, Flame Resistant
- Plastic Molded
- Coil
- Electroplated Coil
- Water Resistant: AquaTight Water Resistant coil zippers
- KidZip
- FootZip

=== Trims ===
- Paper Marketing
- Labels
- Metal Fasteners
- Patches
- Heat Seals
- Tapes/Cords
- Packaging

== Distribution ==
Talon zippers are used primarily by manufacturers in the apparel industry and are distributed through their distribution facilities in the United States, Europe, Hong Kong and China and through these designated offices to other international markets, including Taiwan, India, Bangladesh, Indonesia, Vietnam, Dominican Republic and Central America.

== COVID-19 support ==
In April 2020, Talon International retrofitted its manufacturing facilities to provide medical and non-medical staff with Personal Protective Equipment (PPE). Talon supplies 3-ply face masks and face shields of medical grade, as well as cloth masks, gloves, alcohol wipes, hand sanitizers, and gowns for insulation. A part of PPE's proceeds from the sales were to be donated to the organization Feeding America.

== See also ==
- Whitcomb L. Judson
- Gideon Sundback
- Zipper
- Meadville, Pennsylvania
