= Cremalleras Rubi =

Rubi Industria de Cremalleras, S.L.
- Type: Privately held company
- Industry: Manufacturing
- Founded: 1926; 100 years ago
- Headquarters: Rubí (Barcelona), Spain
- Area served: Worldwide
- Products: Zippers, Metal Zipper, Nylon Zipper, Plastic Zipper, Metal Luxe Zipper, Invisible Zipper, Buttons etc...
- Number of employees: 120
- Website: www.rubizippers.com

Rubi Industria de Cremalleras is a Spanish company that manufactures zippers and is one of the oldest companies to do so.

== History ==
Cremalleras Rubi was founded in 1926 in the town of Rubí, Barcelona, which still maintains its headquarters and single plant.

In the 1930s, the British company Imperial Metallurgic Industries (IMI) bought the company and, having no experience in the market of the zippers, partnered with one of the European leaders in the industry, the German manufacturer Opti.

The company remained in forefront of the European market until the late seventies. In 1981, due to financial difficulties, the Spanish subsidiary defaulted and four years later, it was bought their 256 employees, turning the company into a labor corporation (SAL).

The company regained its original name Rubi Industria de Cremalleras in 1996. The company continued to grow but as a result of the 2008 financial crisis in 2009 the company started a restructuring process. This cumulated in 2016 with a buy out from two investment funds that refloating the business. Although it reverted to a conventional corporation, “in spirit” it remains in the hands of its workers.
