= Coil zipper =

Type of zipper

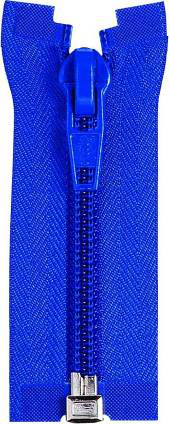

Coil zipper—also known as nylon coil zipper—is a type of zipper whose teeth/elements are made from coiled monofilament that is traditionally nylon. The coil zipper was first invented in 1940, however not commonly used until the 1960s.

The finished zipper is made by sewing a continuous nylon coil onto zipper tape. This continuous coil forms the chain of interlocking teeth. When the coil is attached to the reverse side of the tape rather than the front, the zipper is known as an invisible zipper.

== Design ==
Nylon zippers are highly flexible and are available in a wide range of sizes. The compatibility of the coil zippers with various applications is a main attribute for their prominent number of applications in fashion wear, canvas goods, and bags. These types of zippers are also a common choice for the outdoor and luggage industries.

Though nylon is a popular material for coil zippers, polyester is now sometimes used.

=== Benefits ===
Coil zippers offer higher horizontal strength. Coil zippers are also easier to repair; an out-of-alignment tooth can be realigned simply by zipping and unzipping past it. Another advantage of nylon zippers is its two-way functionality. The sliders can be fixed in either direction of the zipper chain and they will still function smoothly. Nylon is lightweight, heat resistant and rustproof, making nylon coil zippers durable and reliable.

== Manufacturing ==
The main elements required in the manufacturing process of coil zipper are a stringer, slider, and a tab. The stringer consists of a tape and teeth assembly. The tab is used to pull the slider up and down which opens and closes the zipper.

== Applications ==
Sports/Outdoor Apparel
Sports and outdoor apparel need a sturdy zipper that can withstand harsh use. Coil zippers are strong and therefore are commonly used for these kinds of outdoor apparel.

Fashion/Apparel
Like all zippers, coil zippers are often used in general apparel. Zippers are often required in different designs or vibrant colors to match the garments. Coil zippers are easily produced in various colors and sizes and thus they are often used fashionable garments.

Footwear
Shoes and boots that use zippers in their design need a zipper which is smooth in its operation and has high strength. Coil zippers use nylon that provides enough strength to these zippers that they function well even in high-end boots and shoes.

Outdoor Gear
Outdoor gear such as camping equipment and backpacks often need to be robust or cover a longer length. Nylon coil zippers have high strength all across their length. They can be used in all the items which need long zippers.
