= Tex Corp =

Indian fastening product manufacturer

Tex Corp Limited
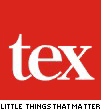
- Founded: 1987
- Headquarters: Gurgaon, India
- Key people: Anil Tandon, Managing Director; Mudit Tandon, Vice President
- Products: Zippers and other fastening products
- Number of employees: 500
- Website: www.texzipper.com

Tex Corp is an Indian multinational manufacturer of zippers, sliders and other fastening products. Headquartered in Gurgram, it supplies global fashion retailers primarily in Europe and the United States.

== Background ==
Formed in New Delhi in 1987 by a group of Indian Institutes of Management alumni, Tex is one of the largest manufacturers and exporters of zipper and fastening products for the apparel industry. It has two manufacturing facilities in India and one each in Bangladesh and Vietnam, becoming the first Indian owned multinational zipper manufacturing organization. Tex's business group also has interests in apparel manufacturing and renewable energy.

Among Tex's clients are the Gap, Macy's, Kohl's, Express, Target, Talbots, Belk, HBC, H&M, Debenhams, Next, Tesco and Matalan. Tex's products are delivered directly to its customers' manufacturing facilities located primarily in the Indian Subcontinent, South-East Asia, Africa and Europe.

Tex adheres to the International Organization for Standardization (ISO)9001:2008 standard. Tex is also an Oeko-Tex Product Class 1 and Eco-tex certified organization. Its products are Consumer Product Safety Improvement Act and Registration, Evaluation, Authorisation and Restriction of Chemicals (REACH) compliant.
