= Gideon Sundback =

Swedish-American inventor (1880-1954)

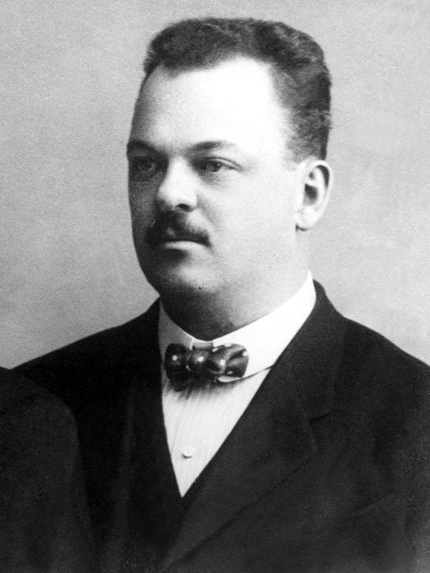
- Sundback c. 1920
- Born: Otto Fredrik Gideon Sundbäck; April 24, 1880; Ödestugu Parish, Jönköping County, Småland, Sweden
- Died: June 21, 1954 (aged 74); Meadville, Pennsylvania, United States
- Resting place: Greendale Cemetery
- Occupation: Electrical engineer
- Known for: Invention of the zipper
- Spouse: Elvira Aronson (m. 1909)

Otto Fredrik Gideon Sundbäck (April 24, 1880 – June 21, 1954) was a Swedish-American electrical engineer, who is most commonly associated with his work in the development of the zipper.

== Background ==
Otto Fredrik Gideon Sundbäck was born on Sonarp farm in Ödestugu Parish, in Jönköping County, Småland, Sweden. He was the son of Jonas Otto Magnusson Sundbäck, a prosperous farmer, and his wife Kristina Karolina Klasdotter. After his studies in Sweden, Sundbäck moved to Germany, where he studied at the polytechnic school in Bingen am Rhein, graduating in engineering in 1903. In 1905, he emigrated to the United States.

== Personal ==
On June 5, 1909, Sundbäck married (Naomi) Elvira Aronson, daughter of the Swedish-born mechanic and inventor Peter Aron Aronsson, in Hoboken, New Jersey.

== Legacy ==
In 2006, Sundbäck was honored by inclusion in the National Inventors Hall of Fame for his work on the development of the zipper. On April 24, 2012, the 132nd anniversary of Sundbäck’s birth, Google changed the Google logo on its homepage to a Google Doodle of the zipper, which when opened revealed the results of a search for Gideon Sundbäck.

== 1917 patent ==
Sundbäck's U.S. patent 1,219,881 (filed in 1914, issued in 1917):

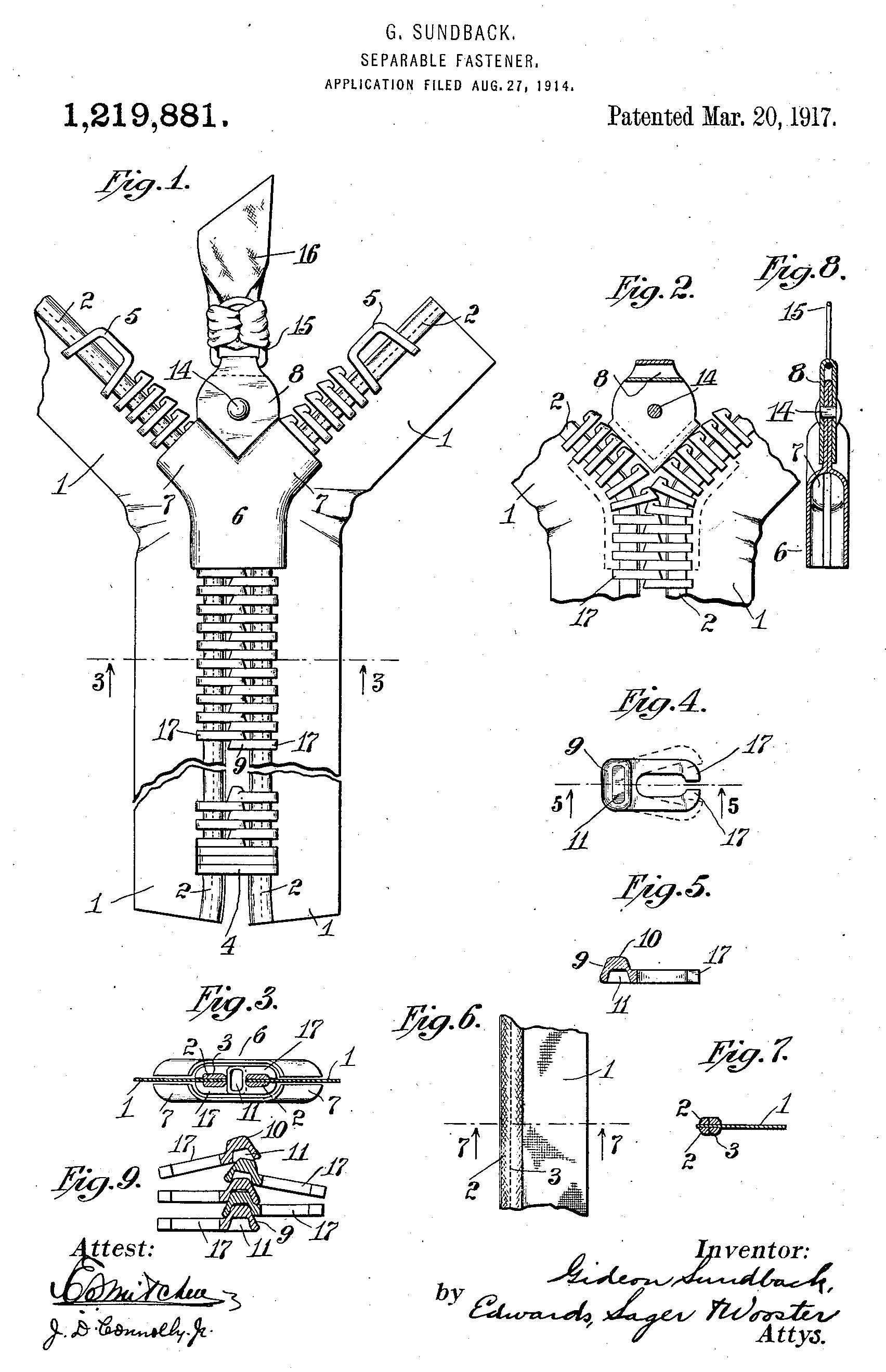

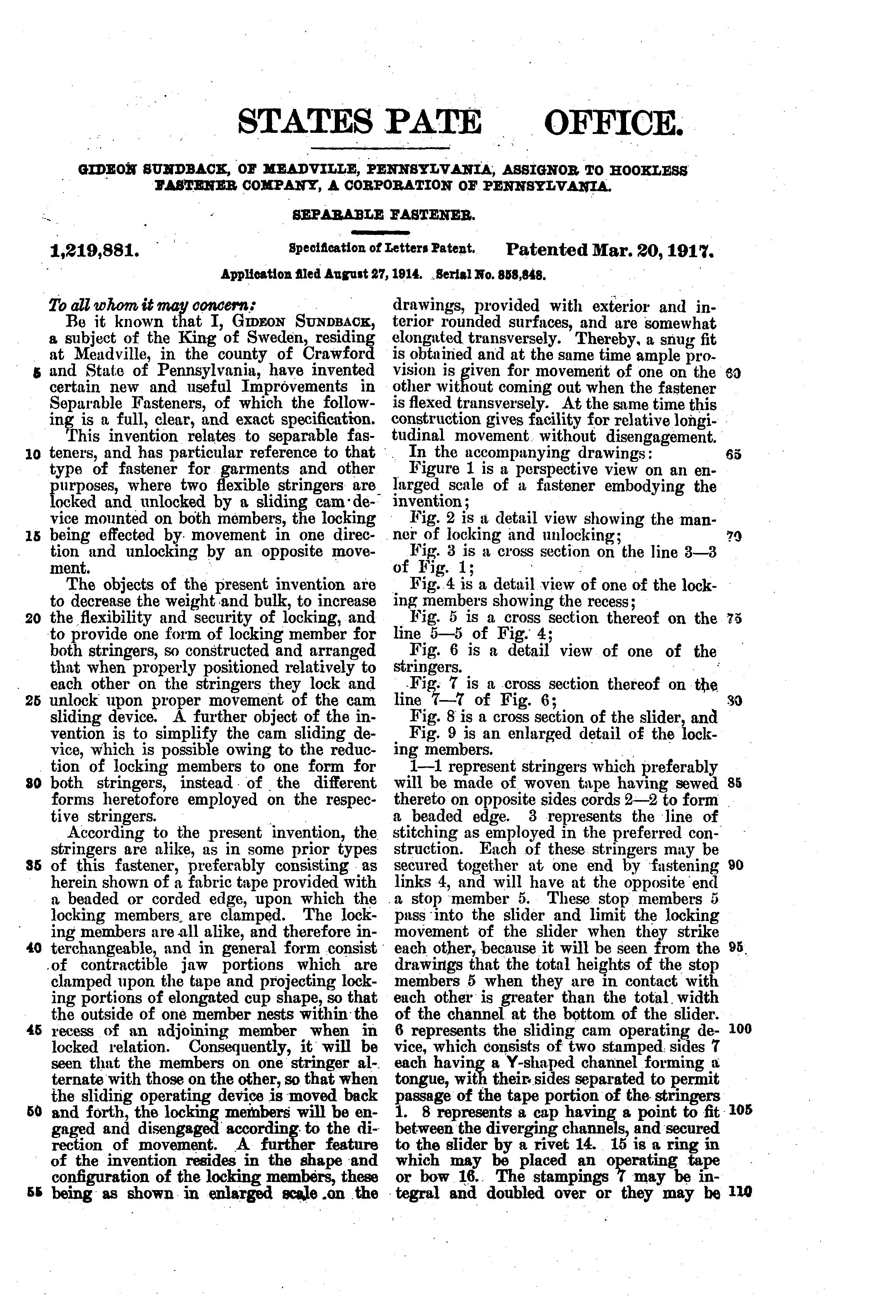

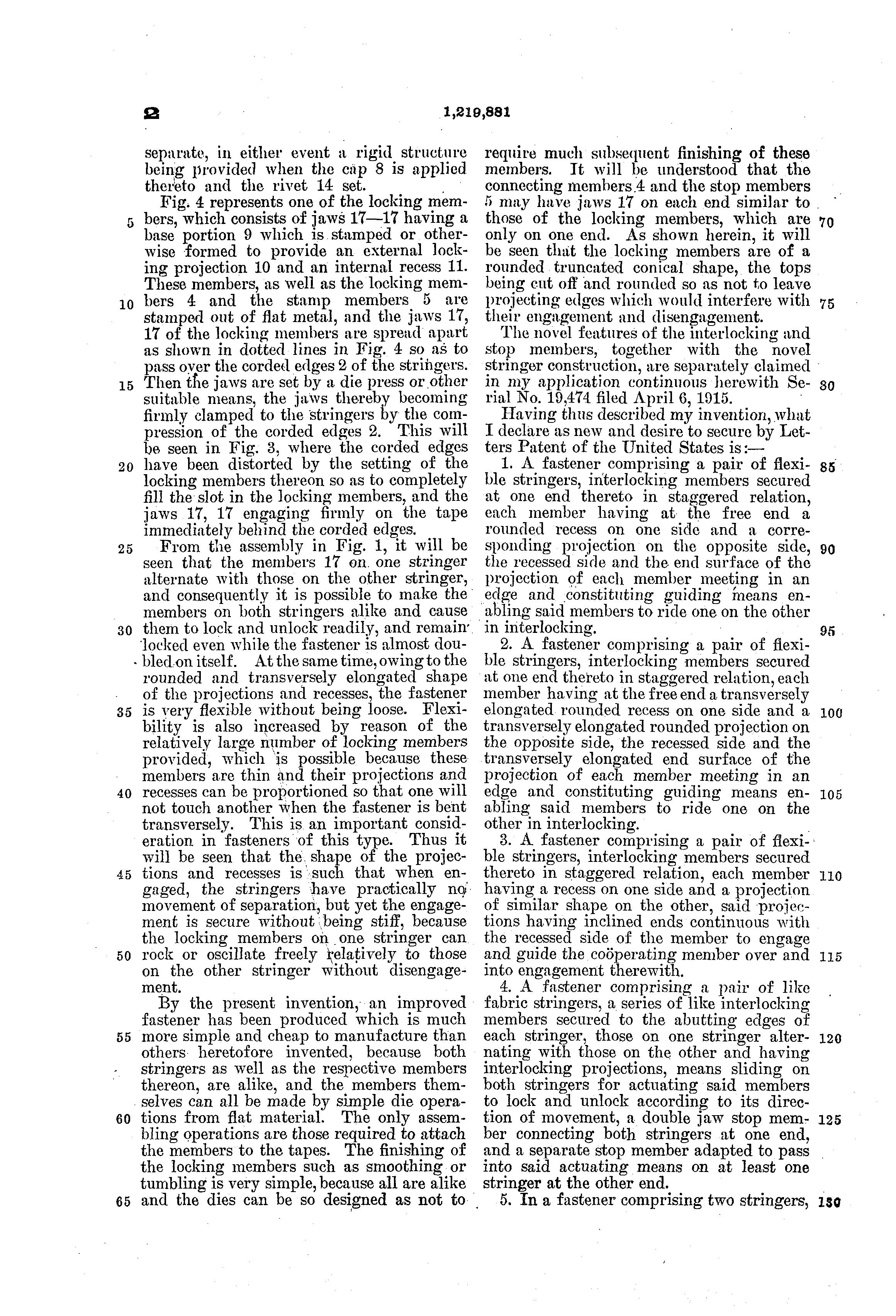

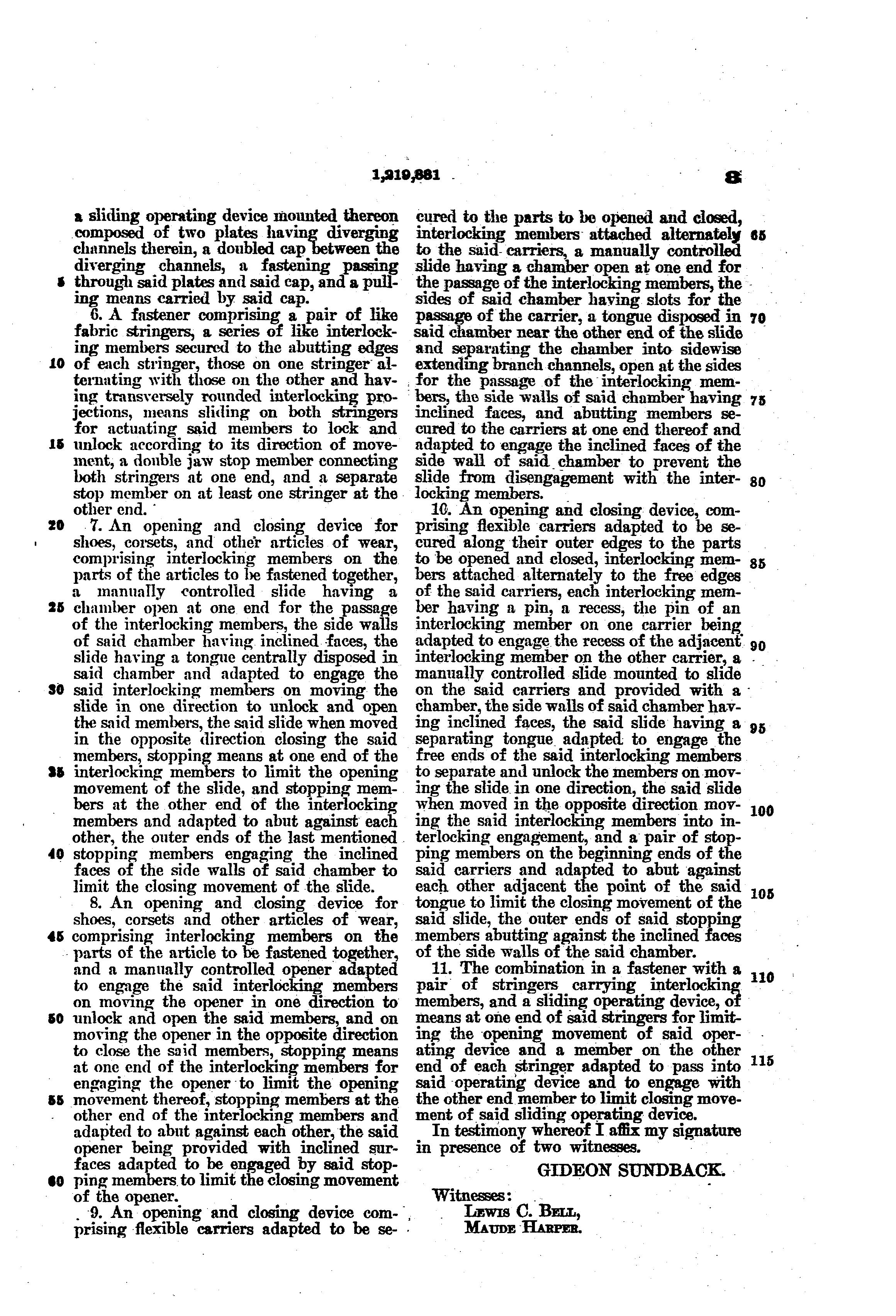

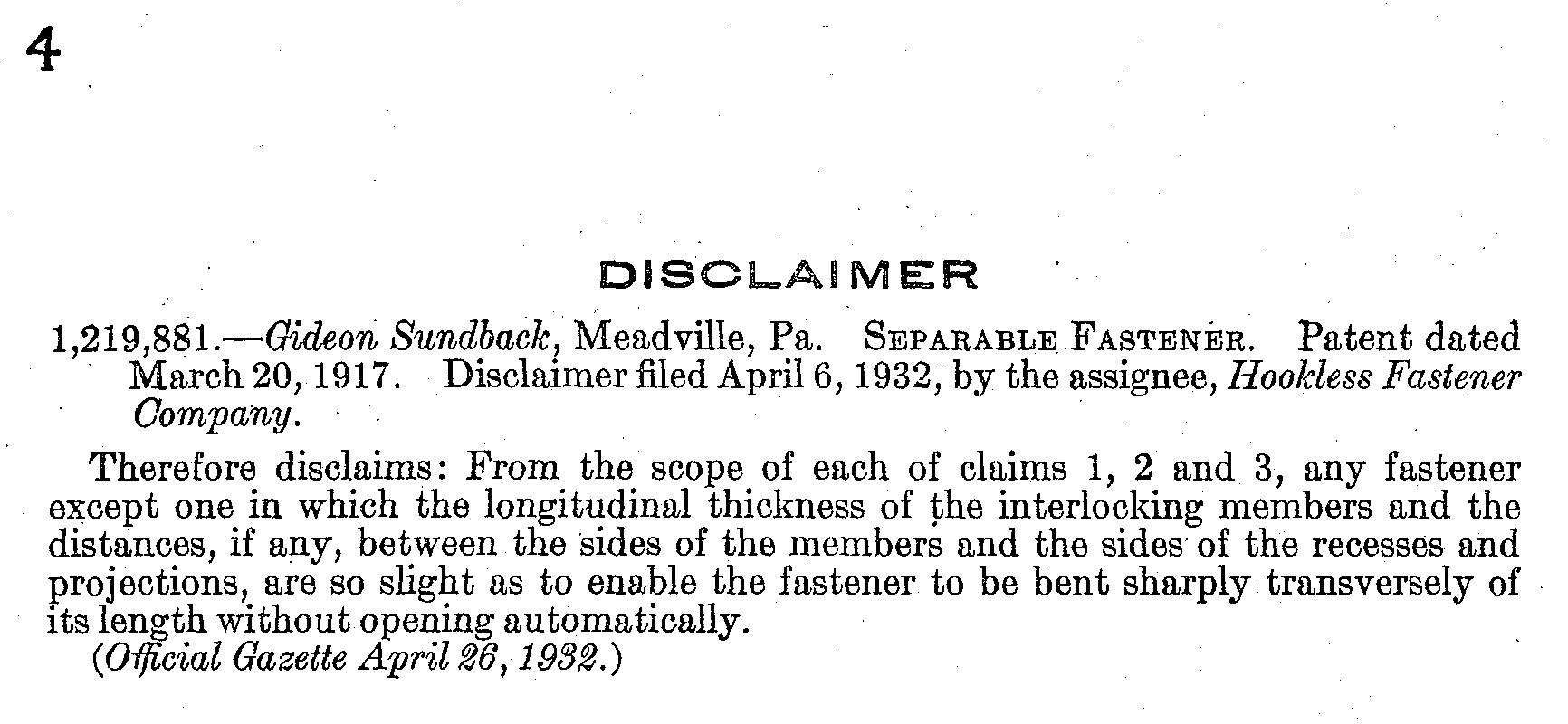

== Other sources ==
- Petroski, Henry (1992) The Evolution of Useful Things (Vintage Books) ISBN 0-679-74039-2
- Friedel, Robert (1996) Zipper: An Exploration in Novelty (W. W. Norton and Company) ISBN 0-393-31365-4
