= Competition Tribunal (Canada) =

Federal adjudicative body in Canada

- French: Tribunal de la concurrence
- Judge term length: 7 years
- Number of positions: 4
- Type of tribunal: Tribunal

Chairperson
- Currently: Andrew D. Little
- Since: April 30, 2022
- Lead position ends: November 4, 2027

Judicial Members
- Currently: Denis Gascon; Paul S. Crampton; Jocelyne Gagné

Lay Members
- Currently: Dr. Wiktor Askanas; Binah Nathan; Dr. Stephen Law; Dr. Ted Horbulyk; Ramaz Samrout; Competition Tribunal

Tribunal overview
- Preceding Tribunal: Restrictive Trade Practices Commission
- Key documents: Competition Act; Competition Tribunal Act
- Website: ct-tc.gc.ca

The Competition Tribunal (French: Tribunal de la concurrence) is the federal adjudicative body in Canada responsible for cases regarding competition laws under the Competition Act.

The Tribunal hears cases that deal with such matters as business mergers; abuse of dominant position; agreements between competitors; refusal to comply; price maintenance; other restrictive trade practices; deceptive marketing practices; specialization agreements; delivered pricing; foreign judgments, law, and directives that "adversely affect economic activity in Canada;" and refusals to supply by foreign suppliers.

The Tribunal is headed by a chairperson, currently Andrew D. Little, who was appointed on April 30, 2022, which he will serve until November 4, 2027.

The Tribunal is one of two Canadian federal organizations responsible for competition law and the Competition Act, with the other being the Competition Bureau. The vast majority of cases are resolved by the Bureau prior to reaching the Tribunal.

== History ==
The Tribunal was founded as the Restrictive Trade Practices Commission, which was empowered to investigate suspected offenses under the Combines Investigation Act.

In 1986, the Government of Canada enacted major reforms of Canada's competition law by introducing simultaneously the Competition Tribunal Act and the Competition Act, the latter of which would replace the Combines Investigation Act. The Competition Act dissolved the Restrictive Trade Practices Commission and created the Competition Tribunal and the Competition Bureau. Unlike the commission, the Competition Tribunal has no authority to investigate offenses, as investigations are now the responsibility of the Competition Bureau to carry. Rather, the Tribunal simply can make findings and issue remedial orders.

On June 30, 1986, Justice Barbara Reed was designated by the Governor in Council as the Tribunal's first chairperson. In 1993, Justice William McKeown became the second chairperson, holding the position until 2002.

In 2002, various changes were made to the Competition Act and the Competition Tribunal Act. Private parties were given the right to initiate proceedings before the Tribunal in certain cases. The Tribunal could also hear references filed pursuant to section 124.2 of the Competition Act and award costs of proceedings before it.

== Members ==
The Tribunal has a hybrid composition, made up of both judicial members from the Federal Court and expert lay people, i.e., "non-judicial members who are knowledgeable in economics, industry, commerce or public affairs." Members are appointed by Governor in Council for fixed terms of up to seven years (reappointment is also allowed), with judicial members on the recommendation of the Minister of Justice, and lay members on the recommendation of the Minister of Innovation, Science and Industry.

Judges adjudicate issues of law, while judges and lay people may adjudicate issues of mixed law and fact. The Tribunal's decisions may be appealed to the Federal Court of Appeal.

The Tribunal is headed by a chairperson, who also decides the allocation of work of the Tribunal members. The chairperson is appointed by the Governor in Council from one of the judicial members.

Current members, as of 2023
Member	First appointed	End of current term
Andrew D. Little, Chairperson	November 5, 2020	November 4, 2027
Jocelyne Gagné	December 21, 2016	December 20, 2023
Denis Gascon (former Chairperson)	April 30, 2015	April 29, 2022
Paul S. Crampton	March 19, 2010	April 29, 2022

Former Judicial Members
Member	First appointed	End of final term	Chairperson
Leonard Martin	June 30, 1986	October 24, 1991 (resigned)	
Barbara Reed	June 30, 1986	October 19, 1992 (resigned)	Yes
Max M. Teitelbaum	June 30, 1986	April 15, 1993 (resigned)	
Barry Strayer	June 30, 1986	April 23, 1993 (resigned)	
Marc Noël	May 28, 1993	June 25, 1998	
Marshall E. Rothstein	May 28, 1993	January 22, 1999	
William P. McKeown	April 1, 1993	September 1, 2002 (retired)	Yes + re-appointed
Sandra J. Simpson	June 10, 1993	June 9, 2014	Yes + re-appointed
Marc Nadon	December 16, 1998	December 14, 2001	
Allan Lutfy	June 8, 1999	September 19, 2001	
François Lemieux	February 26, 2002	February 25, 2009 (retired)	
Eleanor R. Dawson	February 26, 2002	December 28, 2009	
Pierre Blais	October 29, 2002	February 20, 2008	
Edmond P. Blanchard	October 29, 2002	November 25, 2012	
Johanne Gauthier	November 26, 2009	October 21, 2011	
Robert M. Mainville	November 26, 2009	June 18, 2010	
André F.J. Scott	September 29, 2011	January 31, 2014	
Donald J. Rennie	May 3, 2012	February 27, 2015	Yes
Robert L. Barnes	April 30, 2015	April 29, 2021	

== Cases ==
Matters before the Tribunal are usually of national interest. The Tribunal hears cases that deal with such matters as business mergers; abuse of dominant position; agreements between competitors; refusal to comply; price maintenance; other restrictive trade practices; deceptive marketing practices; specialization agreements; delivered pricing; foreign judgments, law, and directives that "adversely affect economic activity in Canada;" and refusals to supply by foreign suppliers.

As of 2012, the Competition Tribunal had adjudicated only six contested merger cases. The vast majority of cases are resolved by the Competition Bureau prior to reaching the Tribunal.

In 2015, the Tribunal ruled in favour of the Canadian Real Estate Association in a case brought by the Bureau. The Bureau argued that a number of restrictions imposed by the CREA on private sellers hoping to list their homes on multiple listing service were contrary to a 2010 deal. The Tribunal later scheduled a rehearing on the issue in September 2015.
