= Affordable Housing and Groceries Act =

Canadian federal government bill

Parliament of Canada
- Long title: An Act to amend the Excise Tax Act and the Competition Act

Legislative history
- Bill title: C-56
- Introduced by: Deputy Prime Minister and Minister of Finance Chrystia Freeland
- First reading: 21 September 2023

The Affordable Housing and Groceries Act, Bill C-56 (French: Loi sur le logement et l’épicerie à prix abordable) is a proposed legislation tabled in the House of Commons of Canada on 21 September 2023. The legislation has two parts. The first will temporarily remove the goods and services tax (GST) on new residential rental developments. The second part consists of three competition-related changes.

Bill C-56's amendments will expand the role of the Minister of Industry, which is expected to politicize the competition policy enforcement process. Critics of the bill note that competition policy is unlikely to be helpful in reducing price inflation in the grocery sector, as studies indicate it is a low-margin industry that has been hit by recent adverse macroeconomic shocks. The Business Council of Canada says there has been inadequate consultation to consider the proposed amendments' possibly wide-ranging consequences.

== Purpose ==
A press release from Canadian Prime Minister Justin Trudeau's office on 14 September 2023 said the government "will incentivize the construction of much-needed rental homes". Also, "to address the escalating price of groceries" the government "will take immediate steps to enhance competition across the Canadian economy, with a focus on the grocery sector, which would help drive down costs for middle-class Canadians." Finance Minister Chrystia Freeland said the bill includes "historic" changes to the way competition law works in Canada which, she argued, could have a meaningful impact on grocery prices.

== Proposed changes ==
Bill C-56 has two parts. First, a removal of GST charges on new residential rental developments until the end of 2030. Second, the bill proposes three competition-related changes:

(1) the Competition Bureau would be able to seek a court order to compel parties to produce information (such as business records or sworn testimony) for a market study. (At present, participation in market studies is voluntary, although the Bureau already has such powers when investigating Competition Act violations.) However, the Competition Bureau is permitted to seek such a court order only if the Minister of Industry has directed the Bureau to conduct the market study. The Bureau must also seek the Minister's approval for the terms of reference for its market study. Further, the Minister may demand a market study regardless of whether the Competition Commissioner believes that actionable anti-competitive conduct is occurring or has occurred. As a consequence, the legislation introduces a political decision-maker into the day-to-day administration of the Competition Act.

(2) remove the "efficiencies defence," a provision that allows companies to argue a merger is warranted because it will create efficiency gains.

(3) permit the Competition Tribunal to make orders against anti-competitive behaviour even if none of the parties to an agreement are competitors. This move is particularly aimed at situations where large grocers form agreements with landlords (who are not competitors of grocers) that prevent smaller grocers from establishing operations nearby.

== Reception: Removal of the GST on new rental construction ==
Bill C-56 will remove GST charges on new rental developments until the end of 2030. The rebate percentage of the GST will rise from the current 36% to 100%, and there will be no limit on the amount (currently there is no rebate for units valued at $450,000 or more.) The rebate will apply to any building with at least 90% of its units designated for long-term rental. Projects must have at least four private units to qualify, or 10 individual units for student or senior living residences. The change is expected to cost $4.6 billion over six years.

New Democratic Party MP Lindsay Mathyssen said her party has long called for the GST to be waived for new apartments, while Conservative leader Pierre Poilievre said his party would remove the GST from new rental construction only when the average rent on the property is below the market rate. Ontario, British Columbia and Newfoundland and Labrador said they will eliminate provincial sales tax on new rental construction, but Quebec will not, saying it would be too costly.

The president of the GTA's Building Industry and Land Development Association said the tax was "a barrier for purpose-built rentals" and its removal "is a really significant step." Rob Gillezeau, assistant professor of economic analysis and policy at the University of Toronto said the GST rebate proposal is a "meaningful" move, but "you would need many, many more policy changes at this level or larger to really start to shift the dial on housing."

== Reception: Competition policy changes ==
=== Politicization of competition policy ===
The government's proposal to allow the Minister of Industry to direct the Commissioner of Competition to conduct a market inquiry adds to the Minister's power. It thereby raises questions with respect to the optics of the Competition Bureau's independence and "may give the government leverage in discussions with market participants regarding competition, or possibly other matters." Goldy Hyder, the president and CEO of the Business Council of Canada, says this change is an "outright and overt politicization" of the competition regime.

An inability to compel documents from subjects as part of its market studies was cited as a barrier to the Competition Bureau's investigation of concentration in the grocery sector earlier in 2023. However, mandatory participation in market studies has raised concerns about "politically-motivated fishing expeditions" against parties who would not be alleged to have contravened the Competition Act (although the requirement of a court order to compel information may mitigate this risk). While the use of market studies may seem unobjectionable, "there is a very real danger that the subjects of such studies will be participants in industries caught in the political spotlight at any given time – such as the grocery industry now – whether or not there is a legitimate competition law concern." Further, there is a risk that, following an extensive and expensive market study, the Competition Bureau may feel some pressure to follow up with enforcement action. Competition practitioners at McMillan LLP note that in the distant past, when Canadian competition authorities had such powers, "it led them, on a number of occasions, down expensive blind alleys."

=== Impact on grocery prices ===
Competition law practitioner Michael Osborne argues recent grocery price inflation is likely driven by macroeconomic factors, rather than a lack of competition. In June 2023 the Competition Bureau found the grocery industry was a low-margin business and a modest increase to low margins cannot explain the double-digit food price inflation in Canada. Similarly, an August 2023 Bank of Canada study found no support for the view that inflation is driven by firms exercising market power to increase prices through higher markups. Osborne notes that if grocery store chains enjoyed enough market power to drive prices higher they would not have waited for the pandemic or the Russian invasion of Ukraine.

Amendments proposed in bill C-56 are very broad and are not expected to directly affect grocery prices other than, by increasing competition they could, eventually, reduce food prices. In a technical briefing, senior government officials said that efforts related specifically to grocery prices are "being executed through a separate process."

=== Impact on economic growth: (a) Efficiency ===
Professor Jeffrey Church of the University of Calgary opposes bill C-56's elimination of the efficiency defence because, while competitive markets are desirable because they usually provide the most efficient outcome, a merger may sometimes lead to a more efficient result. This can happen if a merger generates economies of scale, improves productivity, or enhances innovation. Church argues that if efficient resource allocation does produce exceptional harm for some people, the response should be not to forego the efficiency gains, but to introduce offsetting income transfers, as governments have already done for many decades.

=== Impact on economic growth: (b) Uncertainty and investment ===
Bill C-56's amendment to prevent anti-competitive agreements between parties that do not compete is aimed at the practice of grocery retailers requiring restrictive covenants that prevent renting retail space to a competitor in their agreements with landlords (landlords are not competitors of grocers). While bill C-56 will apply to grocery store agreements, all industries and all types of agreements that reference a competitor (e.g. exclusivity agreements) have as their purpose an effect on competition. The proposed amendment therefore introduces potential uncertainty for parties considering ordinary commercial protections for their investments. Growth may therefore be impacted to the extent that greater uncertainty hampers investment.

The Business Council of Canada President and CEO, Goldy Hyder, said officials had promised that any changes to the Competition Act would be done only after comprehensive consultations with all impacted stakeholders, but the amendments "came as an ambush" without adequate consultation or parliamentary debate. Hyder notes "Few companies, foreign or domestic, will want to make significant investments in a country that changes its corporate laws so capriciously." He concludes that if the goal is to increase competition by attracting new entrants to the Canadian market, "it is difficult to conceive of a worse way for us to achieve it."

== See also ==
- Competition Act
- Competition Bureau
- Goods and services tax (GST)
