= The Honourable =

Honorific style name prefix

The Honourable (Commonwealth English) or The Honorable (American English; see spelling differences) (abbreviation: Hon., Hon'ble, or variations) is an honorific style that is used as a prefix before the names or titles of certain people, usually with official governmental or diplomatic positions.

== Use by governments ==
=== International diplomacy ===
In international diplomatic relations, representatives of foreign states are often styled as The Honourable. Deputy chiefs of mission, chargés d'affaires, consuls-general, consuls and honorary consuls are always given the style. All heads of consular posts, whether they are honorary or career postholders, are accorded the style according to the State Department of the United States. However, the style Excellency instead of The Honourable is used for ambassadors and high commissioners only.

=== Africa ===
==== Democratic Republic of the Congo ====
In the Democratic Republic of the Congo, the prefix 'Honourable' or 'Hon.' is used for members of both chambers of the Parliament of the Democratic Republic of the Congo. Informally, senators are sometimes given the higher style of 'Venerable'.

==== Ghana ====
The style of Honourable is accorded members of parliament in Ghana. It is also extended to certain grades of Royal Orders awarded by Ghana's sub-national Kingdoms.

==== Kenya ====
The style Honourable is used to address members of the Kenyan parliament. Traditionally, members of Parliament are not allowed to call each other by name in the chambers, but rather use the terms "Honourable colleague" or "Honourable Member for ...". The written form is Hon. [Last Name], [First Name] or Honourable [Last Name] or Honourable [Position] (e.g. Honourable Speaker).

==== Mauritius ====
Recipients of the rank of Grand Officer or above of the Order of the Star and Key of the Indian Ocean and persons knighted by Queen Elizabeth II are automatically entitled to prefix The Hon, Hons or The Honourable to their name. Commanders and Officers may request permission from the President to use this prefix. Recipients of the order who are not Mauritian citizens may not use the prefix or post-nominals unless granted permission by the President. All 70 members of the National Assembly also use this prefix, including all Cabinet ministers.

==== Nigeria ====
All members of the House of Representatives of Nigeria, the lower chamber of Nigeria's legislature or National Assembly are entitled to the honourific prefix The Honourable whereas members of the upper house (senate) enjoy the style distinguished senator to their names. Also in use is as a reference style for high ranking members of the Nigerian judiciary (The Honourable Justice or The Honourable Chief Justice) like judges of State High Courts, Federal High Courts, Courts of Appeal and Justices of the Supreme Court.

==== South Africa ====
All members of the South African parliament and the nine provincial legislatures are entitled to this prefix.

=== Europe ===
==== Germany ====
A rough equivalent of the style Honourable would be Hochwohlgeboren 'high well-born', which was used until 1918 for all members of noble families not having any higher style. Its application to bourgeois dignitaries became common in the 19th century, though it has faded since and was always of doubtful correctness.

Ehrwürdig or Ehrwürden, the literal translation of 'honourable', is used for Catholic clergy and religious—with the exceptions of priests and abbesses, who are Hochwürden 'reverend'. A subdeacon is Wohlehrwürden 'very honourable'; a deacon is Hochehrwürden 'right honourable'.

==== Ireland ====
In Ireland, all judges of the High Court, Court of Appeal and Supreme Court are referred to as The Honourable Mr/Ms Justice.

==== Italy ====
In Italy, the style The Honourable (Italian: Onorevole) is customarily used to refer to a member of the Chamber of Deputies. Former members of parliament can maintain the style.

==== Malta ====
All members of the unicameral Parliament of Malta are entitled to this prefix.

==== The Netherlands ====
An extensive system of honorifics used to be in place in the Netherlands. In a more formal setting it still is. De weledele heer/vrouwe 'the honourable lord/lady' is used for the genteel bourgeoisie. The middle classes are instead addressed with De heer/mevrouw 'sir/madam', which is the equivalent of Mr/Ms in English.

Also typical is the use of De weledelgeboren heer/vrouwe 'the well-born lord/lady', for students at universities, traditionally children of the genteel bourgeoisie.

The system adds honorifics based on prestige for military officers based on rank, barristers, prosecutors, judges, members of parliament, government ministers, nobles, clergy, and for academic degrees of master's and above.

In the Dutch language, Mr is a formal and academic title, for both men and women, protected by Dutch law. It stands for Meester 'master', and is strictly reserved for holders of a master's degree in law (LL.M.) who are qualified to practice law. Holders are addressed as De weledelgestrenge heer/vrouwe Mr 'the honourable strict lord/lady master', followed by their name.

==== Spain ====
In the Spanish Autonomous Community of Catalonia, the style Honorable (Catalan: Honorable) is used for current and former members of the cabinet (consellers) of the Catalan Government (Generalitat de Catalunya). Former and current heads of government or president of the Generalitat are given the style of Molt Honorable ("Very Honorable"). This also applies to current and former heads of government of the Autonomous Communities of Valencia and Balearic Islands.

==== United Kingdom ====
===== Entitlement =====
In the United Kingdom, all sons and daughters of viscounts and barons (including the holders of life peerages) and the younger sons of earls are styled with this prefix (the daughters and younger sons of dukes and marquesses and the daughters of earls have the higher style of Lord or Lady before their first names, and the eldest sons of dukes, marquesses and earls are known by one of their father's or mother's subsidiary titles). The style is only a courtesy, however, and on legal documents they may be described as, for instance, John Smith, Esq., commonly called The Honourable John Smith. As the wives of sons of peers share the styles of their husbands, the wives of the sons of viscounts and barons and the younger sons of earls are styled, for example, The Hon. Mrs John Smith. Likewise, the married daughters of viscounts and barons, whose husbands hold no higher title or dignity, are styled, for example, The Hon. Mrs Smith.

In 1912, King George V granted maids of honour (royal attendants) the style of the honourable for life, with precedence next after daughters of barons.

The Honourable is also customarily used as a form of address for most foreign nobility that is not formally recognised by the sovereign (e.g. ambassadors) when in the UK.

Some people are entitled to the prefix by virtue of their offices. Rules exist that allow certain individuals to keep the prefix The Honourable even after retirement.

- Judges of the High Court and other superior courts in the Commonwealth (if the judge is a knight, the style Sir John Smith is used socially instead of The Honourable Mr Justice Smith); and
- Members of Commonwealth executive and legislative councils (or senates) where the legislature is bicameral.

Several corporate entities have been awarded the style by royal warrant, for example:

- The Honourable Artillery Company
- The Honourable East India Company
- The four Inns of Court (for example The Honourable Society of the Middle Temple)
- The Honourable Company of Master Mariners
- The Honourable Company of Air Pilots

===== Usage =====
The style The Honourable is usually used in addressing envelopes (where it is usually abbreviated to The Hon.) and formally elsewhere, in which case Mr or Esquire are omitted. In speech, however, The Honourable John Smith is usually referred to simply as Mr John Smith.

In the House of Commons of the United Kingdom, as in other traditionally lower houses of Parliament and other legislatures, members must as a minimum refer to each other as the honourable member or my honourable friend out of courtesy, but they are not entitled to the style in writing. Members who are 'senior' barristers may be called the honourable and learnèd member, serving or ex-serving members of the military the honourable and gallant member, and ordained clergy in the House the honourable and reverend member, a practice that the Modernisation Committee recommended should be abolished, but the use of which has continued. When anyone is entitled to be styled Right Honourable this is used instead of honourable.

In the Falkland Islands, the style the honourable is given to any serving or former members of the Legislative Assembly or Legislative Council.

In the Isle of Man, the style the honourable (often abbreviated to Hon.) is used to refer to a minister while holding office.

=== North America ===
==== Canada ====
In Canada, while not always enshrined in legislation, some people are commonly referred to as The Honourable (French: l'honorable). Those who have the honorific for life include:

- Senators
- Members of the King's Privy Council for Canada (mostly members or former members of the federal Cabinet)
- Lieutenant governors
- Members of the executive councils (provincial ministers), and living former ministers as of a specified date, of four provinces:
  - Nova Scotia (since 2009, initially only those who ended their ministerial service after 2009. In 2010 the privilege was extended to all living former ministers who ended their service earlier. In 2014 the privilege was further granted to six living former speakers.)
  - Saskatchewan (since 2019)
  - Alberta (since 2022)
  - Ontario (since 2025)

People who have the honorific only while in office include:

- The speaker of the House of Commons of Canada, though it is customary for former speakers to be appointed to the privy council after their term
- Members of provincial and territorial executive councils (premiers, cabinet ministers and deputy premiers). Some executive councillors (see above) have the honorific for life.
- Speakers of provincial and territorial legislatures
- Government house leaders of provinces and territories
- Territorial commissioners
- Justices of the Supreme Court of Canada
- Justices of the Federal Court and Federal Court of Appeals, Tax Court of Canada
- Justices of the Court Martial of Canada and Court Martial Appeal Court of Canada
- Justices of provincial superior courts (trial and appellate)
- Provincial inferior court judges

Derivatives include:

- The Honourable Mr/Madam Justice — justices of federal courts, provincial appellate and superior courts.
- The Honourable Judge — judges of provincial courts and formerly judges of district or county courts.

In all cases, the governor general of Canada may grant permission to retain the style after they cease to hold office. Persons eligible to retain the style include the speaker of the House of Commons (who may already be eligible as a privy councillor), territorial commissioners, and judges of certain courts (e.g., the Supreme Court of Canada). The most recent former justice granted such privileges was Frank Iacobucci.

It is usual for speakers of the House of Commons to be made privy councillors, in which case they keep the style for life. A leader of the Official Opposition who has not previously been a cabinet minister may be appointed to the Privy Council, particularly at times of military conflict or other national security crises, so that they may be given security clearance, granting them the style (being the only non-government MP accorded such privilege). In the past, certain provincial premiers (e.g., Peter Lougheed, Bill Davis, Joey Smallwood and Tommy Douglas) were elevated to the Privy Council and gained the style, but such practice is rare.

Members of the House of Commons of Canada and of provincial legislatures refer to each other during proceedings of the house with the courtesy style "honourable member" (or l'honorable député) as an option ("member" or député alone are also acceptable), but their name is not otherwise prefixed with the Honourable (unless they are privy councillors or executive councillors).

Current and former governors general, prime ministers, chief justices of Canada and certain other eminent persons use the style of Right Honourable for life (or le/la très honorable in French). This was originally subject to being summoned to the British Privy Council. Several early prime ministers were not summoned to the British Privy Council, and hence were styled The Honourable: Alexander Mackenzie, Sir John Abbott and Sir Mackenzie Bowell.

Members of the Executive Council of Quebec have not used the style The Honourable since 1968 but retain the ability to do so, and are often accorded the honorific in media and by the federal government.

==== United States ====
In the United States, the prefix the Honorable has been used to formally address various officials at the federal and state levels, but it is most commonly used for the President-elect, governors, judges, and members of Congress when formally addressing them. The style may be conferred pursuant to federal government service, according to federal rules, or by state government service, where the rules may be different. Modifiers such as the Right Honorable or the Most Honorable are not used. The 't' in 'the' is not capitalized in the middle of a sentence.

Under the rules of etiquette, the President, Vice President, members of both houses of Congress, governors of states, members of state legislatures, and mayors are accorded the title. Persons appointed to office nominated by the President and confirmed by the Senate are accorded the title; this rule includes members of the Cabinet and sub-Cabinet (such as deputies and undersecretaries), administrators, members, and commissioners of the various independent agencies, councils, commissions, and boards, federal judges, ambassadors of the United States, U.S. Attorneys, U.S. Marshals, the Architect of the Capitol, the Librarian of Congress and Public Printer of the United States, and presidentially appointed inspectors general.

High state officials other than governor, such as lieutenant governor and state attorneys general are also accorded the style Honorable. State court judges and justices of the peace, like federal judges, also are accorded the style Honorable. Practices vary on whether appointed state officials, such as the heads of state cabinet-level departments are given the title. There is also no universal rule for whether county or city officials other than the mayor (such as city council, board of aldermen, board of education, planning and zoning commission, and code enforcement board members, or city manager or police chief or fire chief) are given the title; as these may be different state by state.

Members of the White House staff at the rank of special assistant, deputy assistant, assistant to the president, and Counselor to the President are accorded the title. Officials nominated to high office but not yet confirmed (e.g., commissioner-designate) and interim or acting officials are generally not accorded the style Honorable, except for cabinet-level officials.

Opinions vary on whether the term the Honorable is accorded for life. According to the protocols of the U.S. Department of State, all persons who have been in a position that entitled them to The Honorable continue to retain that honorific style for life. However, the State Department is not an authority on state and local officials such as mayors, members of state legislatures, and high state officials. The prefix is not used for people who have died.

Some estimate that in the United States there are nearly 100,000 people who are accorded the "Honorable" title, many in the Washington, D.C. region. Civilian officials, including service secretaries (e.g., Secretary of the Army) of the Pentagon receive the title.

The style The Honorable is used on envelopes when referring to an individual in the third person. It is never properly used to refer to oneself.

A spouse of someone with the style of the Honorable receives no additional title.

=== Caribbean ===
==== Caricom ====
Members of the Order of the Caribbean Community are styled The Honourable for life.

==== Antigua and Barbuda ====
In Antigua and Barbuda, members of the Senate and House of Representatives are styled The Honourable while holding office. The Governor-General may also authorize former office holders and other distinguished persons to hold the title for life.

==== Barbados ====
In Barbados, members of the Parliament carry two main titles: members of the House of Assembly are styled The Honourable, while members of the Senate are styled "Senator". Companions of Honour of the former Order of Barbados from the pre-republic era of Barbados, as well Members of the current Order of the Republic, are accorded the style The Honourable.

==== Jamaica ====
In Jamaica, members of the Order of Merit, and the Order of Jamaica are styled The Honourable.

==== Trinidad and Tobago ====
In Trinidad and Tobago The Prime Minister, government ministers, the leader of the opposition and ministers within government ministries (junior ministers) are styled as The Honourable, senators serving as ministers are styled as Senator The Honourable, ministers with doctorates are styled as The Honourable Dr. or Dr. the Honourable (rare).

=== Oceania ===
==== Australia ====
In Australia, the style is allowed to be used by past and present:

- Governors-General and Governors
- Members of the Federal Executive Council
- Premiers and ministers in all states
- Presiding officers of federal and state parliaments (except ACT Legislative Assembly speakers)
- Members of all state legislative councils except in Victoria
- Chief ministers and ministers in the Northern Territory
- Leaders of the Opposition in Tasmania
- High Court Justices
- Federal Court Justices
- Federal Circuit and Family Court of Australia, Division 1 Justices
- Justices of the supreme court in states and territories.

The abbreviation in Australia is 'The Hon' (without a full stop).

===== Governors-General =====
In May 2013, the title was given approval by Queen Elizabeth II to be granted to past, present, and future Governors-General of Australia, to be used in the form His or Her Excellency the Honourable while holding office, and The Honourable in retirement.

===== Governors =====
By December 2014, the practice of appointing the vice-regal office holder, as well as former living, the style The Honourable for life had also been adopted for the state governors of New South Wales, Queensland, South Australia, Western Australia, Victoria and Tasmania (where it did not apply to past governors), as well as the Administrator of the Northern Territory.

===== Government ministers =====
In Australia, all ministers in Commonwealth and state governments and the government of the Northern Territory are entitled to be styled the Honourable. The Australian Capital Territory does not have an executive council and so its ministers are not entitled to the style. In Victoria, the style is granted for life, so it is customary for former ministers to retain the style after leaving office. With respect to New South Wales, Queensland, South Australia and Tasmania the King-in-Council may grant former ministers the style for life. The same principle applies in the Northern Territory via the chief minister, to the administrator, to the governor-general, then to the King. A minimum five years' service as a member of the executive council and/or as a presiding officer is a prerequisite. In Western Australia, conditional on royal assent, the style may become permanent after three years' service in the ministry. All such awards are published in the Commonwealth Government Gazette. The presiding officers of the parliaments of the Commonwealth, the states and the Northern Territory are also styled the Honourable, but normally only during their tenure of office. Special permission is sometimes given for a former presiding officer to retain the style after leaving office, as is the case in the Northern Territory.

===== Members of Parliament =====
The title Honourable is not acquired through membership of either the House of Representatives or the Senate (see Parliament of Australia). A member or senator may have the style if they have acquired it separately, e.g. by being a current or former minister. During proceedings within the chambers, forms such as "the honourable member for ...", "the honourable Leader of the Opposition", or "my honourable colleague" are used. This is a parliamentary courtesy and does not imply any right to the style.

Traditionally, members of the legislative councils of the states have been styled the Honourable for the duration of their terms. That practice is still followed in New South Wales, Western Australia, South Australia and Tasmania. In Victoria, the practice was abolished in 2003. In New South Wales, Greens NSW members of the Legislative Council, who are eligible for the Honourable style, have refrained from using it, deeming it to be "outdated" and a "colonial trapping".

===== Judges =====
Judges of all superior courts are also referred to formally by the style the Honourable, both during and after holding the office.

==== New Zealand ====
The style The Honourable was first granted in 1854 for use by members of the Executive Council, the Speaker of the Legislative Council, the Members of the Legislative Council, and the Speaker of the House of Representatives.

In July 2006, the Governor-General (and former living Governors-General) were granted the use of the title The Honourable for life, unless they already held the title The Right Honourable (via membership of the Privy Council). This title was also granted to Prime Ministers, Chief Justices, and Speakers of the House of Representatives, along with judges of the Supreme, Appeal, and High Courts of New Zealand - albeit only during their tenures in these offices, unless they already held the title Right Honourable. These officeholders would be eligible for a recommendation (from the Prime Minister) to retain these titles for life following their relinquishment of/retirement from those offices. Furthermore, authority for considering these recommendations was now delegated to the Governor-General, rather than the monarch.

The rules were amended again in 2010, granting the title of The Right Honourable for life to sitting and future Governors-General, Prime Ministers, Speakers of the House of Representatives, and Chief Justices. It also permitted these officeholders to use the letters 'PC' after their name to denote membership of the Privy Council, if they are privy counsellors. However, it granted the Prime Minister the power to strip the title of Right Honourable from these titleholders, via issuing such advice to the monarch.

New Zealand office holders who are The Honourable ex-officio are usually granted the style for life by the Governor-General as a courtesy when they vacate the office; all honours and awards are published in The New Zealand Gazette.

=== Asia ===
==== East Asia ====
===== South Korea =====
In South Korea, the prefix The Honourable is used for the following people:

- Ministerial Members of Cabinet of Korea
- Leaders and Floor Leaders of Parties and Members of Shadow Cabinet.
- Governors and Ministerial members of Provinces
- Mayors of Metropolitan Cities
- Judges at Supreme Court of Korea and Chief Justices of Provincial Level Courts.

===== Hong Kong =====
In Hong Kong, the prefix The Honourable is used for the following people:

- The Chief Executive of Hong Kong
- Members, including the President, of the Legislative Council
- Members of the Executive Council, including official members such as the Chief Secretary, the Financial Secretary, the Secretary for Justice, and other secretaries of bureaux
- Judges of the Court of Final Appeal
- Justices of Appeal of the Court of Appeal
- Judges of the Court of First Instance
- Individuals who have been awarded the Grand Bauhinia Medal, the highest medal in Hong Kong's honours system.
- Deceased heroes (29 to date) who served in any of the disciplined services under the Security Bureau

===== Macau =====
In Macau, the prefix The Honourable is used occasionally for the following people:

- Chief Executive of Macau
- Members, including the President, of the Legislative Assembly of Macau
- Members of the Executive Council
- The Secretariat for Administration and Justice (Macau), the Secretariat for Economy and Finance (Macau), and other Principal officials
- Judges of the Court of Final Appeal
- Individuals who have been awarded the Grand Medal of Lotus Flower, the highest medal in Macau's honours system.

==== South Asia ====
===== Bangladesh =====
In the People's Republic of Bangladesh, Chief Justice, Supreme Court Justices, House Speaker, Ministers, Members of Parliaments, Interim Advisers, PM Advisers, VVIPs and the Mayor are entitled to the style Honourable. On the other hand, the Prime Minister, Chief Adviser of Bangladesh and the President are styled Honourable or Excellency.

===== India =====
In India, judges of the high courts and Supreme Court of India are addressed as Honourable (Hon'ble); often stylized and abbreviated as "HMJ", i.e., Honourable Mr./Ms. Justice, followed by their name.

The elected legislators (members of legislative assembly, members of parliament) and heads of government (The President, The Prime Minister, union ministers, chief ministers, and governors) are also formally called Honourable followed by their name. The Vice President of India is addressed as the hon'ble as well.

===== Pakistan =====
In Pakistan, the judicial officers are addressed as honourable while presiding over in the courts of law. It is a norm to address judges of superior judiciary as honourable judges. Diplomats are addressed as Your Excellency. The head of state and Prime Minister is addressed her/his excellency.

===== Sri Lanka =====
In Sri Lanka, the honorific The Honourable is used to refer to the President, Prime Minister, Ministers, and Members of Parliament. Attorney-General and Solicitor-General as well as Judges of the Supreme Court, the Court of Appeal and the High Courts.

==== Southeast Asia ====
===== Malaysia =====
In Malaysia, The Honourable (The Hon) or Yang Berhormat (YB) – the style of members of parliament and state legislative assemblymen. The prefix Yang Berhormat is also used for recipients of the First and Second Classes of the Johor's Orders of Chivalry who is titled Dato' for men and Datin Paduka for women, regardless of whether a member of parliament or not.

===== Myanmar =====
In Myanmar, the Chief Justice and Justices of the Supreme Court of Myanmar are referred as 'The Honourable'.

===== Philippines =====
In the Philippines, the style is usually used to give distinction to any elected official (whether in office or retired) ranging from the smallest political unit, the barangay, to the Congress of the Philippines, which consists of the Senate and House of Representatives. Appointed officials such as members of the Cabinet (secretaries, acting secretaries, ad interim secretaries, undersecretaries, and assistant secretaries), the Solicitor General, and heads of government agencies at the national and local levels are also accorded this style. For example, a kagawad (barangay or village council member) named Juan de la Cruz will be referred to as The Honorable Juan de la Cruz. In written form, the style may be shortened to "Hon." (e.g. Hon. Juan de la Cruz).

The vice-president, chief justice, ombudsman, justices of the Supreme Court, Sandiganbayan, and Court of Appeals, and trial court judges are also addressed in this honorific style. Meanwhile, the president of the Philippines, members of the diplomatic corps, Filipino diplomats, and Catholic archbishops is always given the style His/Her Excellency. Cardinal-Archbishops of the Catholic Church are addressed as His Eminence.

===== Singapore =====
The chief justice, judges of appeal, and justices of the Supreme Court, and the Presiding Judge and District Judges of the State Courts are conventionally addressed in formal settings using the honorific The Honourable.

All former Prime Ministers and current Members of the Singapore Parliament is formally addressed in international settings using the honorific The Honourable.

The use of the honorific The Honourable to refer to the Prime Minister, Ministers, and Members of Parliament is not required by the Standing Orders of Parliament, but during a 1988 parliamentary debate the Leader of the House, Wong Kan Seng, said it would be polite for MPs to refer to their colleagues using the terms "Mr.", "Honourable Mr." or "Honourable Minister" depending on their choice.

The honorific is usually also used to address the Attorney-General and Solicitors-General, and the heads of states and leaders of foreign countries on short-term visits to Singapore.

== Non-governmental use ==
Private, non-profit, and non-governmental (NGO) organisations, and religious movements sometimes style a leader or founder as The Honourable, e.g. The Honourable Elijah Muhammad.

== See also ==
- Honour (style)
- The Most Honourable
- The Right Honourable
- The Much Honoured
- Worship (style)
- Honorary degree (also uses the abbreviation "Hon" in front of that of the degree, e.g. Hon DLitt)
