= Church of Atheism of Central Canada v Canada (National Revenue) =

2019 Canadian federal court case

- Court: Federal Court of Appeal
- Full case name: Church of Atheism of Central Canada v Minister of National Revenue
- Decided: November 29, 2019
- Citation: 2019 FCA 296

Case opinions
- Atheism is not a religion and not eligible for charity status
- Decision by: Justice Rivoalen
- Concurrence: Justice Nadon; Justice Rennie

Keywords
- religious charity

Church of Atheism of Central Canada v Canada (National Revenue) 2019 FCA 296 (CanLII) is a Federal Court of Appeal case in Canada. It was brought by the Church of Atheism of Central Canada against the Canada Revenue Agency after the Minister of National Revenue rejected their application for religious charitable status. The court determined on a unanimous verdict that atheism is not a religion and not eligible for tax-exempt charity status.

== Background ==
The Church of Atheism of Central Canada was a registered non-profit organisation in Ottawa. They applied under the Income Tax Act, 1985 for the status of a charity, which would have allowed all their income to be tax-free under Canadian law. The Minister of National Revenue rejected their application on the grounds that they did not meet the statutory definition of a charity under the act. The Church of Atheism appealed the decision on the grounds of religious discrimination and alleged violations of the Canadian Charter of Rights and Freedoms and the Constitution Act, 1982.

== Case ==
The case was heard to decide if there was a violation of the rights and freedoms of the Church and if the Minister's decision was reasonable. The court noted there was no clear definition of a charity in statute, so the court relied upon Canadian common law which had found that a charity either was involved in "the advancement of religion" or "certain other purposes beneficial to the community". The court ruled that as the Church was a non-profit, they were not individuals so were not entitled to equality protection. They further found that the rights of atheists were protected and that the Minister declining to grant the Church charitable status did not interfere with their practices.

The court then considered if the rejection was reasonable. The Church claimed that atheism was a religion and that they believed in "The Ten Commandments of Energy" as a sacred text. However, the court found that atheism was not a religion as it failed to meet the common law criteria to be religion and that worshipping energy did not count as belief in a Supreme Being or Deity. However the court did not rule on whether a religion needed to have an authoritative text such as the Bible in Christianity nor whether there had to be a belief in God after the Church cited Buddhism as a recognised religion that did not believe in a higher power. The Church had also argued that under the "certain other purposes" definition, they were a religious self-help group. The court rejected this argument as they found that the group only helped its own members and was not "rehabilitative or therapeutic". As a result, the court ruled that the Minister's rejection was justified as the Church of Atheism lacked a charitable purpose and did not carry out charitable activities. In a unanimous decision with all three judges concurring, Justice Marianne Rivoalen ruled that the appeal was to be dismissed.

== Appeal to the Supreme Court of Canada ==
On January 28, 2020, the Church filed an application for leave to appeal with the Supreme Court of Canada on the basis that the cases raises issues of public importance and of central importance to the legal system, specifically the state's duty of neutrality. The Supreme Court dismissed the application on October 29, 2020.
