= Paul S. Crampton =

Canadian judge

The Honourable Paul S. Crampton

2nd Chief Justice of the Federal Court
- Incumbent
- Assumed office December 15, 2011
- Nominated by: Stephen Harper
- Appointed by: David Johnston
- Preceded by: Allan Lutfy

Personal details
- Occupation: Jurist
- Profession: Law
- Website: Federal Court biography

Paul S. Crampton was the Chief Justice of Canada's Federal Court. He was appointed to the Court in 2009 and became Chief Justice in 2011. Crampton retired from the Court in 2025.

Crampton received a Bachelor of Arts (Philosophy) from l’Université du Québec in 1981. He received a Bachelor of Laws and Masters of Business Administration from the University of Ottawa in 1985. He later received a Masters of Law from the University of Toronto in 1987. He was admitted to the Bar of Ontario in 1988.

Throughout his legal practice, Crampton primarily practiced competition law and foreign investment law. From 1988-1989, Crampton held positions in the Competition Bureau, and was special advisor to the Commissioner of Competition in Ottawa and executive assistant to the Senior Deputy Commissioner of Competition. From 1991-1992, Crampton was an associate at Stikeman Elliot. He was later a partner at Davies, Ward, Phillips and Vineberg from 1992-2002. From 2002-2004, he was Head of the Outreach, Competition Division, Organisation for Economic Co-operation and Development (OECD) in Paris, France. At the OECD, he was responsible for overseeing work in the competition field with developing and transitioning countries. He was a partner at Osler, Hoskin & Harcourt from 2004 until his appointment to the Federal Court in 2009.

Crampton was appointed to the Federal Court on November 26, 2009 and appointed a member of the Competition Tribunal in March 2010. He was appointed as Chief Justice on December 15, 2011, replacing outgoing Chief Justice Allan F. Lutfy. On June 26, 2025, Crampton announced his intention to retire from the court on October 31, 2025. Upon his retirement, Associate Chief Justice Martine St-Louis became Acting Chief Justice of the Federal Court.

Crampton is the author of Mergers and the Competition Act, a competition law textbook published by Carswell Publications.
