= Combines Investigation Act =

Canadian act of Parliament

Combines Investigation Act, 1923

Parliament of Canada
- Enacted: 1923
- Repealed: July 1986

Repeals
- The Board of Commerce Act; Combines and Fair Prices Act

Amended by
- Criminal Law Amendment Act, 1968–69

Repealed by
- Competition Act

Related cases
- Hunter v Southam Inc
- Status: Repealed

The Combines Investigation Act, 1923 (French: Loi relative aux enquêtes sur les coalitions), was a Canadian Act of Parliament that regulated certain anti-competitive corporate business practices. It prohibited monopolies, misleading advertising, bid-rigging, price fixing, and other means of limiting competition.

First introduced in 1910, the original legislation was repealed before an updated version was enacted in 1923 by MacKenzie King; the Act was also amended in 1969 by the Criminal Law Amendment Act, 1968–69.

It was a rather notorious piece of legislation in Canadian constitutional law for the powers it granted to non-police officers to enter private premises without a judicially-issued search warrant and seize evidence that they suspected were in relation to a violation of the Act. This led to the Supreme Court decision in Hunter v Southam Inc where provisions of the Act were held to be inoperative in light of the recently enacted Canadian Charter of Rights and Freedoms' section 8 protection against unreasonable search and seizure. The Act was repealed in July 1986 and replaced with the Competition Act.

The Combines Investigation Act was the eventual successor to the Anti-Combines Act, passed on 2 May 1889 as the first antitrust statute in the industrial world.

== History ==
Anti-Combines Act
- Long title: An Act for the Prevention and Suppression of Combinations Formed in Restraint of Trade
- Enacted: 2 May 1889
- Repealed: May 1910
- Introduced by: Nathaniel Clarke Wallace

Repealed by
- Combines Investigation Act, 1910

Related legislation
- US: Sherman Act; Clayton Act
- Status: Repealed

On 2 May 1889, the 6th Canadian Parliament enacted An Act for the Prevention and Suppression of Combinations Formed in Restraint of Trade, better known as the Anti-Combines Act, the first antitrust statute in the industrial world, over a year prior to the United States' Sherman Act.

The primary instigator of the legislation was Nathaniel Clarke Wallace, a Conservative MP, who introduced the bill in 1888 after chairing a House of Commons committee set up to investigate combines.

The language used in the Anti-Combines Act proved to be limited however, and made it difficult to secure and marshal evidence in a combines prosecution. Up to 1900, there was only one prosecution, resulting in an acquittal.

As result, Anti-Combines Act was replaced by the Combines Investigation Act, 1910, passed in May 1910.

This Act defined a "combine" in the same general sense as the section 498 of the Criminal Code and simultaneously introduced the concept of a harmful "merger, trust or monopoly." W . L. Mackenzie King, Canada's first Minister of Labour (and later Prime Minister), argued that the creation of combines was not criminal in and of itself, and therefore elaborated that investigations would replace criminal prosecution as an effective method of combine control. However, no permanent agency was established to enforce the legislation, and investigations were too complicated and costly for individuals to set in motion.

Moreover, the criminal law provisions were evidently ineffectual, as only a handful of cases were brought between 1910 and 1976; only one conviction was obtained, and that upon a guilty plea.

In 1912, the Supreme Court of Canada held in Weidman v Shragge that the purpose of the anti-combines provisions was to protect the interest of the public in having free competition. From this, it was concluded that once a contract or agreement inordinately interfered with competition, it was illegal.

In order to address the issues found with the Combines Investigation Act, 1910, Parliament passed The Board of Commerce Act and Combines and Fair Prices Act in 1919, as two new means of combines control in the wake of inflation following the Great War.

Creating a body analogous to the U.S. Federal Trade Commission via the Federal Trade Commission Act of 1914, the Board of Commerce Act set up a board of three members and charged it with the general administration of the latter act. The Board had the power to restrain and prohibit the formation of any combine, which was defined as any merger, trust, monopoly, or anti-competitive agreement, tacit or otherwise, which the Board deemed to not be in the public interest. The Board also had the authority to initiate investigations and impose sanctions if a combine was found.

The issue discovered with the two 1919 laws however was that the Board of Commerce legislation transferred power to an administrative tribunal to regulate and control practices solely on the basis of its opinion as to whether they were harmful to the community. In this sense, in 1921, the Board of Commerce case led to the Privy Council's determination of the two Acts as ultra vires federal jurisdiction, wherein a constitutional decision marked The Board of Commerce Act as being more valid as an emergency economic legislation rather than as a long-term means of combines control.

=== Combines Investigation Act, 1923 ===
William Lyon Mackenzie King, who had become Prime Minister in 1921, introduced new combines legislation in 1923, filling the gap left by the invalidation of the 1919 laws.

King said that an Act should be passed which borrowed effective features from past legislations and which incorporated additional devices necessary to protect the public from the detrimental effects of combines. The result was the new Combines Investigation Act, 1923.

Peter Heenan was the Minister responsible for the Combines Investigation Act between 1926 and 1930.

The 1923 Combines Act was a success compared to its predecessors. Hundreds of files were opened, and up to 1935, there were 19 formal investigations. Combines were found in 14 of these, resulting in 19 prosecutions and 8 convictions. The Proprietary Articles Trade Association (PATA) was also dissolved as a result of a formal investigation.

In the 1930s, calls to reform the Combines Investigation Act and for government supervision of price control arrangements led to the establishment of the Royal Commission on Price Spreads in 1934. The Commission led to some notable legislative changes, such as an amendment made to the Criminal Code to prohibit price discrimination and predatory pricing.

The major change was the introduction of the Dominion Trade and Industry Commission Act, passed in 1935 to establish the Dominion Trade and Industry Commission, charged with administering the Combines Investigation Act, 1923, among other powers. However, with the Conservative government's defeat in 1935, the new Liberal administration immediately referred the Dominion Trade and Industry Commission Act to the Supreme Court of Canada. The Act was thereby replaced by the 1937 Combines Investigation Act.

The Combines Investigation Act was again amended in 1946 and 1949. In 1950, the MacQuarrie Committee was appointed to review Canada's anti-combines policies and recommend such changes as would "make it a more effective instrument for the encouraging and safeguarding of our free economy."

The Act would again be revised in 1952 and amended in 1969 by the Criminal Law Amendment Act, 1968–69.

The Act granted powers to non-police officers to enter private premises without a judicially-issued search warrant and seize evidence that they suspected were in relation to a violation of the Act. This eventually culminated in a raid of the offices of the Edmonton Journal along with the ensuing Supreme Court decision in Hunter v Southam Inc, where provisions of the Act were held to be inoperative in light of the recently enacted Canadian Charter of Rights and Freedoms' section 8 protection against unreasonable search and seizure. In 1985, the Combines Investigation Act was appealed by the Competition Tribunal Act, and was repealed in July 1986 to be replaced with the Competition Act.

== Cases ==
On 24 February 1975, John P. Rocca, the president of Rocca Cinemas Limited, filed a complaint of unjust discrimination with the Nova Scotia Amusements Regulation Board against Bellevue Film Distributors, Astral Films Limited, Paramount Pictures, United Artists, Warner Bros., Universal Pictures, and 20th Century Fox. He claimed that they violated the Nova Scotia Theatre and Amusements Act by not giving his theatre first-run films. When he opened his theatre, its first showing was a first-time run of Benji (1975), but he was unable to gain other first-run films. The Board started its investigation on May 13, under the leadership of R.B. Kimball and ruled against Rocca after almost three years of investigations. Kimball stated that Rocca could show how historical patterns resulted in allocations that favored Odeon and Famous Players, but not that distributors were legally required to give their first-run films to them.

Jack and the Beanstalk was released in Canada by Columbia Pictures in 1976, and was played in Toronto in the Bijou Theatre and Odeon theatres as a first-run film. The Bijou Theatre lowered its adult ticket price from $3.25 to $1 causing Odeon to file a complaint to Columbia. The Bijou Theatre increased it prices after Columbia threatened to not give it first-run films in the future. A letter sent by Harvey Harnick, Columbia's general manager, to I. Levitt, Columbia's assistant general manager, discussing the event was seized by C.G. McMullen, an investigator for the Department of Consumer and Corporate Affairs. Columbia was charged with violating the Combines Investigation Act and the company pled guilty on 9 June 1977, resulting in a $1,250 fine and an order to not repeat the offense. The crown attorney appealed the decision stating that the provincial court judge did not give sufficient consideration to the aspect of deterrence and the Court of Appeal for Ontario increased the fine to $5,000. This was the first time that an American company was convicted for using monopolistic power to limit competition in Canada.

United Artists was charge with violating the Combines Investigation Act by prohibiting Famous Players from lowering the price of admission for One Flew Over the Cuckoo's Nest, The Missouri Breaks, and A Bridge Too Far; although United Artists claimed that Famous Players misunderstood their demand of not accepting free admission. An order by the Federal Court of Canada prohibited United Artists from price fixing.

Bellevue, an American company that handled the distribution of Walt Disney films in Canada, ordered that theatres charge a minimum admission of $0,25 for all children under twelve as they were getting in for free prior to this. On 19 May 1979, a prohibition order was made against Bellevue for price fixing.

== See also ==
- Board of Commerce case
- Competition Act
