= Strayer =

Strayer is a surname. Notable people with the surname include:

- Barry Strayer (born 1932), Canadian judge
- Frank R. Strayer (1891–1964), actor, film writer, director, and producer
- Janet Strayer, German curler
- Joseph Strayer (1904–1987), American medievalist historian

== See also ==
- Strayer University
