= Michael L. Phelan =

Michael Lawlor Phelan (born June 8, 1947 in Sherbrooke, Quebec) is a retired judge of the Federal Court of Canada. Since retiring, he has been an arbitrator and mediator.

== Career ==
Phelan was educated at Loyola College in Montreal (BA, 1968) and Dalhousie University Law School (LLB, 1971). He was called to the Bar of Ontario in 1973.

On November 19, 2003, he was appointed Judge of the Federal Court, and ex officio, member of the Federal Court of Appeal, and then Judge of the Court Martial Appeal Court of Canada, April 27, 2004.

Landmark cases Judge Phelan ruled on include the 2013 decision that Métis and Non-Status individuals are Indians under the Constitution; and Canadian Copyright Agency (Access Copyright) v York University (2017).
