= Enforcement actions against açaí berry supplement manufacturers =

The use of açaí palm berries in supplements and the marketing of such supplements has led to enforcement efforts in the United States in 2010. Advertisements of açaí berry supplements have been referred to as scams, both for their deceptive offers as well as for a lack of efficacy. A Canadian Anti-Fraud Centre spokesman described the growing number of scams related to the sale of açaí berry supplements as "a major international problem."

== Background ==
=== Negative option billing ===
Many makers of açaí berry supplements have offered their products on the Internet on a negative option basis, meaning that customers automatically receive new shipments until they affirmatively cancel. Such offers are often billed as "free trials," where users are asked to supply billing information to cover shipping and handling. Many consumers fail to realize that, by giving their billing details, they have also agreed to accept recurring shipments, incurring monthly charges of $45 to $65 or even $95.

=== "Fake blog" affiliate marketing ===
Common in the affiliate marketing of açaí berry supplements is the use of fake blogs, describing fictional testimonials of users of the product. It has been reported that some fake blogs also alter the testimonials based on the user's location, deceiving the user into thinking that the supposed endorser is from the local area.

== Enforcement actions ==
On 19 August 2009, Oprah Winfrey sued fifty Internet sellers of açaí berry supplements, including FWM Labs of Hollywood, Florida and MonaVie of Salt Lake City, Utah. Jennifer Eisenbarth, a former contestant on The Biggest Loser, later sued FWM in December 2009 for use of her image in FWM's advertisements. In March 2010, ABC's Nightline reported that FWM settled, resulting in payments of $200,000 in penalties and millions of dollars of refunds to consumers, as well as promises to refrain from deceptive advertising.

Also, in August 2009, Illinois Attorney General Lisa Madigan filed suit against three local açaí berry supplement suppliers and an affiliate marketer.

On 5 August 2010, the Federal Trade Commission sued Coast Nutraceuticals, Inc., a maker of açaí berry dietary supplements. The FTC cited false claims that the pills could cause weight loss or prevent cancer.
