= Marc Noël =

Canadian judge

The Honourable Marc Noël (born October 31, 1948) served as the Chief Justice of the Canadian Federal Court of Appeal between 2014-2023. He retired as Chief Justice and as a judge of the Court as of August 1, 2023.

Marc Noël was born in Quebec, Quebec. Education at University of Ottawa (B.A., L.L.L., L.L.B.). Admitted to the Quebec and Ontario Bar. Partner: Verchere, Noël & Eddy, 1977–89 and Bennett Jones Verchere,1989-92. Lecturer: Faculty of Law, McGill University.; Quebec Bar School and Canadian Institute of Chartered Accountants. Appointed Queen's Counsel in 1990. Appointed Judge of the Federal Court of Canada, Trial Division and ex officio member of the Court of Appeal, June 24, 1992, and Judge of the Court Martial Appeal Court, 1992; Member of the Competition Tribunal, 1993 and Judge of the Federal Court of Canada, Appeal Division, June 23, 1998. Since July 2, 2003, the date of the coming into force of the Courts Administration Service Act, Judge of the Federal Court of Appeal. Appointed Chief Justice of the Federal Court of Appeal, October 9, 2014.
