= Peter Annis =

Canadian judge

Peter Annis is a justice with the Federal Court of Canada.

Prior to his appointment he served as a judge on the Ontario Superior Court.

Annis was appointed to the Ontario Superior Court of Justice in 2010. Prior to that appointment, he was a mediator and arbitrator from 2006 to 2010. He was a partner with Vincent Dagenais Gibson LLP from 2002 to 2005, an associate and partner with Borden Ladner Gervais LLP from 1987 to 2001, and a partner with Honeywell, Wotherspoon from 1985 to 1986. He was the founding director of the Centre for Legal Translation and Documentation at the University of Ottawa and a legal officer at the Department of Justice Canada from 1972 to 1981. His main areas of practice were civil litigation, administrative law, labour and employment law, mediation and arbitration, and Aboriginal law.

Annis was a trustee of the Carleton County Law Association from 2005 to 2008. He was a member of l'Association des juristes d'expression française de l'Ontario, and its president from 2000 to 2002. He was also a member of the Advocates Society, the Ontario Bar Association, the Arbitration and Mediation Institute of Ontario, and the Human Resources Professional Association, Ottawa chapter. He was a part-time lecturer at the University of Ottawa, and an instructor for the Ontario Bar Admission Courses.
