= Judge Simpson =

Judge Simpson may refer to:

- Charles Ralph Simpson III (born 1945), judge of the United States District Court for the Western District of Kentucky
- Charles R. Simpson (Tax Court judge) (1921–2015), United States Tax Court judge
- John Milton Bryan Simpson (1903–1987), judge of the United States Court of Appeals for the Fifth and Eleventh Circuits
- Sandra J. Simpson (fl. 1990s–2020s), judge of the Federal Court of Canada

== See also ==
- Justice Simpson (disambiguation)
