= Marc Nadon =

Canadian judge (born 1949)

The Honourable Mr. Justice Marc Nadon

Federal Court of Appeal of Canada
- Appointed by: Jean Chrétien
- In office 14 December 2001 – 25 July 2021

Federal Court of Canada – Trial Division
- In office 10 June 1993 – 14 December 2001
- Appointed by: Brian Mulroney

Personal details
- Born: September 7, 1949 (age 77) Saint-Jérôme, Quebec
- Spouse: Margaret Buchan
- Education: Université de Sherbrooke
- Occupation: Judge
- Profession: Lawyer

Marc Nadon LL.L. (born September 7, 1949) is a retired judge of the Federal Court of Appeal of Canada. He has practised law in both Quebec and the United Kingdom, focusing on maritime and transportation law. He was also an arbitrator and former lecturer in law at the Université de Sherbrooke. Nadon was nominated by Prime Minister Stephen Harper to be a puisne justice of the Supreme Court of Canada in October 2013. Following controversy about the appointment, the federal government referred the constitutionality of the appointment to the Supreme Court of Canada. In their decision in Reference Re Supreme Court Act, ss 5 and 6, the Supreme Court held he did not meet the eligibility criteria provided in the Supreme Court Act. He therefore could not be sworn in as a judge of the Supreme Court. He continued to sit as a judge of the Federal Court of Appeal.

== Early life and family ==
Marc Nadon was born in St-Jérôme, Québec, on September 7, 1949. His father played professional hockey with the American Hockey League in the 1940s as well as being a businessman. His mother was of Ukrainian background whose parents immigrated to Canada from Ukraine during World War I. She was a professional singer, including singing at the Château Frontenac during the big band era. Nadon's father spoke French and English, but his mother spoke Ukrainian and English. His first language was English, but his education was entirely in French-speaking educational institutions.

As a youth, it was his dream to become a professional hockey player and he played midget hockey in his hometown. He later appeared with the Junior A Laval Saints. However, his father forced him to choose whether he would continue to pursue a career in professional hockey or instead pursue a traditional career path. Nadon chose his studies, though later stated that he had turned down a draft offer from the Detroit Red Wings. In 2013, it was reported that while Nadon was not actually drafted by the Detroit Red Wings, he did play with the Saint-Jérôme Alouettes, a Junior A team whose midget affiliates were part of the Red Wings' farm team network.

Nadon studied at Collège Lionel-Groulx and obtained his diploma of collegiate studies (D.E.C.) in 1970. In 1973, he earned his Licentiate in Laws (LL.L.) from the Université de Sherbrooke.

Nadon has been married for over 30 years to Margaret Buchan, a Scotswoman from the town of Peebles, Scotland. They have a son, Marc-André, who is also a lawyer and who practises at PFD Lawyers.

== As practitioner ==
Nadon was admitted to the Bar of Quebec in 1974 and practiced law until 1993 at the firm of Martineau Walker (known today as Fasken), where he became a partner in 1981. From 1988 to 1990, he worked in the United Kingdom at the firm's London office. His practice essentially involved maritime law and transportation law. He taught maritime law and transportation law at the faculty of law at the Université de Sherbrooke from 1987 to 1992. He primarily wrote about maritime law. In addition to this, he has worked in the fields of insurance and commercial law, particularly in matters regarding letters of credit and letters of exchange.

As a result of his maritime law practice, he often appeared before the Federal Court and the Federal Court of Appeal. He also appeared before the Quebec Superior Court, and on occasion before the Quebec Court of Appeal and the Supreme Court of Canada.

As a lawyer, Nadon also gained experience in the field of arbitration, specifically as arbitrator and member of the American Arbitration Association. He sat on several occasions as an arbitrator of maritime law disputes and was given terms as ad hoc arbitrator, in particular in litigation. He led arbitration in London and New York on behalf of clients in Canada and abroad.

Throughout his years of practice, he was a member of the Canadian Bar Association and a member of the Canadian Maritime Law Association.

== As Federal Court judge ==
Nadon was appointed as a judge to the Federal Court of Canada – Trial Division, and ex officio a member of the Appeal Division of that Court on June 10, 1993. On April 14, 1994, he was appointed as a judge to the Court Martial Appeal Court of Canada. He was appointed as a member of the Competition Tribunal on December 16, 1998, for a term of seven years. On December 14, 2001, he was appointed as a judge to the Federal Court of Canada – Appeal Division (now the Federal Court of Appeal), and ex officio a member of the Trial Division of that Court. He became a supernumerary judge on July 25, 2011 and retired on July 25, 2021.

Nadon was a member of the Federal Courts Rules Committee for a number of years. He was also the Chair of the Education Committee of the Federal Court of Appeal and a member of the Court's Law Clerks Committee.

Nadon's most outstanding ruling (in the opinion of a journalist) was written in 2010 when he found that the government of Stephen Harper had acted lawfully when it denied Omar Khadr repatriation from Guantanamo Bay prison, an offshore warehouse used by the US for detained terrorists. He was the only judge on three levels to side with the government. The Supreme Court of Canada later agreed with his view that it was no business of theirs to mandate Khadr's repatriation.

== Unsuccessful appointment to the Supreme Court of Canada ==
Nadon was nominated by the Conservative government of Prime Minister Stephen Harper to be a puisne justice of the Supreme Court of Canada. He was formally appointed to the Supreme Court of Canada on October 3, 2013, and sworn in on October 7, 2013. Following controversy regarding his appointment, he stated that he would not hear cases until the legal challenge to his appointment was decided. His appointment was struck down as unconstitutional by the Supreme Court in Reference Re Supreme Court Act, ss 5 and 6 on March 21, 2014. By a 6–1 margin, the Court found that he did not meet the requirement of section 6 of the Supreme Court Act, which requires that Quebec appointments to the Court be either a sitting judge on the Quebec Court of Appeal or Quebec Superior Court, or a current member of the Bar of Quebec. Consequently, the Court ruled his appointment had never taken effect and he remained a supernumerary judge of the Federal Court of Appeal.

== Works and speeches ==
=== Learned texts ===
- Tetley, William; Nadon, Marc (1978). Marine cargo claims. Toronto: Butterworths.

=== Seminars ===
In January 2018, at a McGill University law school presentation hosted by the Runnymede Society, Nadon stated his view that the judiciary of Canada too often write their own interpretations of the 1982 Charter of Rights and Freedoms, and thus present their own notions of fairness as substantive law, instead of being guided by the text of the Charter. In that sense, he thinks that they are politically inclined.

Courts are institutions. You're not free to go there and change the world... The law is the law. The law is not just set for you... When I hear judges saying, `Well, I decide cases based on what I think is fair,' that's not my view... I say that sounds to me arbitrary. Remember the statue of justice you see is blind.

Nadon sees himself in the tradition of an originalist and doctrinaire, in that judges must observe doctrine in order to protect the certainty of the law.

If judges abandon principle, abandon doctrine, we are in for very difficult times in the future.
