= Francis Muldoon =

Francis Muldoon may refer to:

- Francis Muldoon, a character in the American sitcom Car 54, Where Are You?
- Francis C. Muldoon (1930–2013), judge of the Federal Court of Canada
