= Margarine Reference =

Canadian constitutional decision

- Court: Judicial Committee of the Privy Council
- Full case name: The Canadian Federation of Agriculture v The Attorney-General of Quebec and others
- Decided: 16 October 1950
- Citation: [1950] UKPC 31, [1951] AC 179

Case history
- Appealed from: Reference re Validity of Section 5 (a) Dairy Industry Act, 1948 CanLII 2, [1949] SCR 1 (14 December 1948), Supreme Court (Canada)

Court membership
- Judges sitting: Lord Porter, Lord Simonds, Lord Morton of Henryton, Lord MacDermott, Lord Radcliffe

Case opinions
- Decision by: Lord Morton of Henryton

Reference Re Validity of Section 5(a) of the Dairy Industry Act (1949), also known as the Margarine Reference or as Canadian Federation of Agriculture v Quebec (AG), is a leading ruling of the Supreme Court of Canada, upheld on appeal to the Judicial Committee of the Privy Council, on determining if a law is within the authority of the Parliament of Canada's powers relating to criminal law. In this particular case, the Court found that a regulation made by Parliament was ultra vires. Though the regulation contained sufficient punitive sanctions, the subject matter contained within it was not the kind that served a public purpose.

The case was decided by the Judicial Committee of the Privy Council on appeal from the Supreme Court of Canada, as the cause for appeal arose before the abolition of such appeals in 1949. The decision by Rand J was upheld in 1951, and the case has been cited in federalism disputes many times since.

== Background ==
Under Section 91(27) of the Constitution Act, 1867, Parliament receives exclusive powers to legislate in regard to the criminal law. The precise meaning of the criminal law power, however, had proved controversial. In the Board of Commerce case, the JCPC seemingly chose to define criminal law power as limited to prohibiting only what was criminal in 1867 (the year of Canadian Confederation). This was overturned in Proprietary Articles Trade Assn. v. A.-G. Can. (1931), in which it was found criminal law means Parliament could legitimately prohibit any act "with penal consequences." The problem with the latter decision was that it gave Parliament an excuse to legislate in regard to many matters.

The matter came before the courts again with the Margarine Reference, where the following reference question was posed to the Supreme Court of Canada:

Is Section 5(a) of the Dairy Industry Act-R.S.C. 1927, Chapter 45 Revised Statutes of Canada ultra vires of the Parliament of Canada either in whole or in part and if so in what particular or particulars and to what extent?

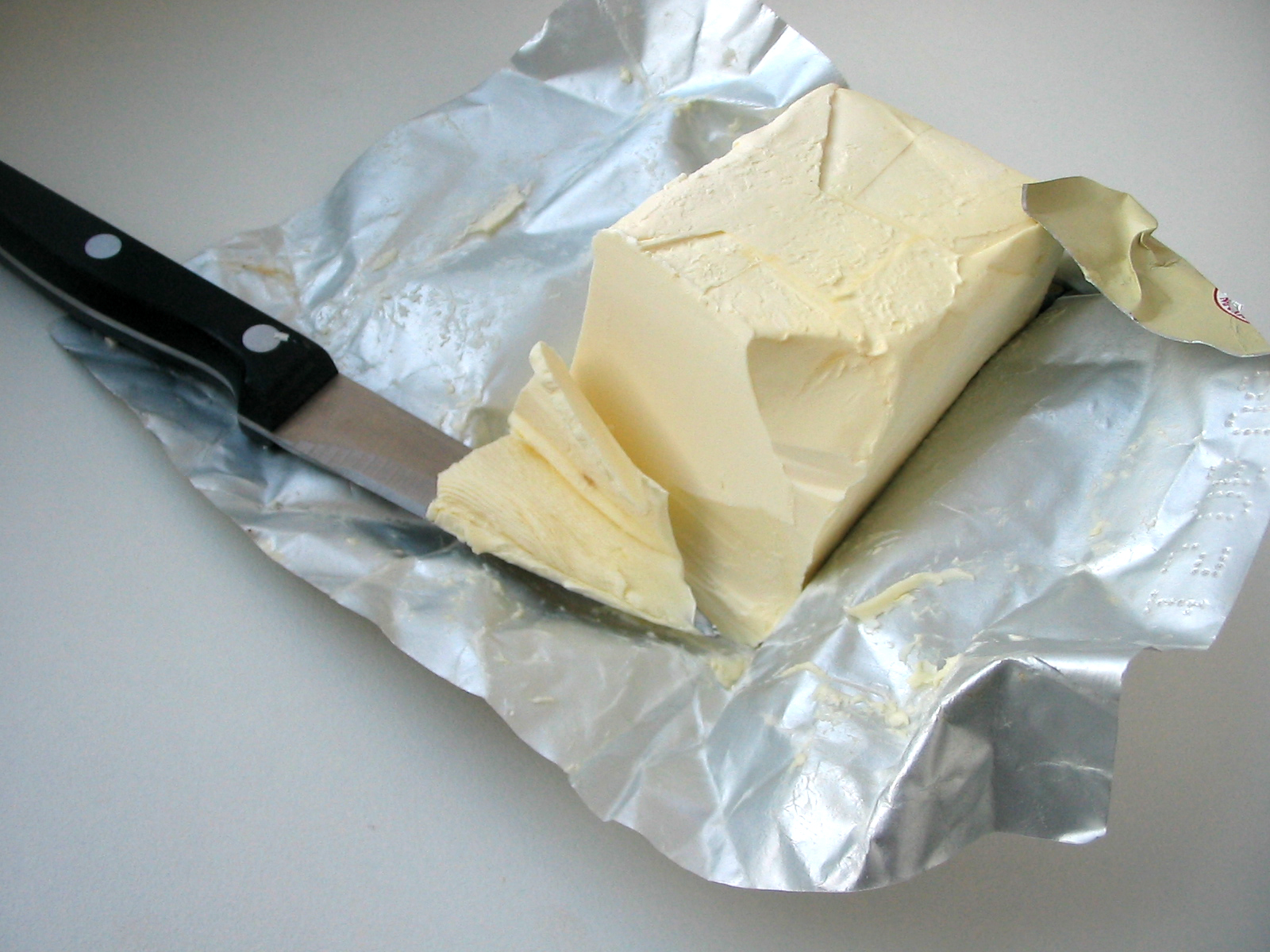
A block of margarine, the product at the heart of the reference

In this case, Parliament had legislated against the production and trade of margarine, in order to give dairy businesses assurances that margarine would not threaten their existence. This legislation actually dated back to 1886, and it was claimed in the law that the real purpose was to target a product that was "injurious to health." If true, that would have made margarine a fair target for criminal law, but the federal government admitted before the courts that the assessment was simply false.

== At the Supreme Court of Canada ==
The Court ruled:

- the prohibition of importation of the goods mentioned in the section is intra vires of Parliament as legislation in relation to foreign trade (Locke J dissented, maintaining that the entire section was ultra vires while expressing no opinion as to the power of Parliament to ban importation by appropriate legislation).
- the prohibition of manufacture, offer, sale, or possession for sale of the goods mentioned is ultra vires of Parliament, as it is legislation in relation to property (Rinfret CJ and Kerwin J dissenting).

Rand J, in his concurring opinion for the majority, struck down the prohibition on production of margarine on the grounds that it was not valid criminal law. The prohibition on importation of margarine, however, was upheld under the federal Trade and Commerce power. He outlined a test to determine if a law fell under the criminal law:

A crime is an act which the law, with appropriate penal sanctions, forbids; but as prohibitions are not enacted in a vacuum, we can properly look for some evil or injurious or undesirable effect upon the public against which the law is directed. That effect may be in relation to social, economic or political interests; and the legislature has had in mind to suppress the evil or to safeguard the interest threatened.

Two requirements must be met for a law to be criminal in nature:

1. the law must be a prohibition with a penal sanction.
2. the law must be directed towards a public purpose.

Rand also listed a few objectives that would qualify as legitimate public purposes, namely "Public peace, order, security, health, morality."

The ruling was appealed to the Privy Council, on the grounds that the legislation was valid under the following:

1. the federal power under s. 91(2).
2. the federal power under s. 91(27).
3. the residual power for peace, order and good government.
4. the power relating to agriculture under s. 95.

== At the Privy Council ==
The Supreme Court ruling was upheld by the Board, which responded to the points appealed thus:

- as noted in R. v. Eastern Terminal Elevator Co., the trade and commerce power does not extend to individual forms of trade and commerce confined within a province
- the criminal law power is not unlimited, in agreeing with Rand J's observation:

The public interest in this regulation lies obviously in the trade effects: it is annexed to the legislative subject matter and follows the latter in its allocation to the one or other legislature. But to use it as a support for the legislation in the aspect of criminal law would mean that the Dominion under its authority in that field, by forbidding the manufacture or sale of particular products, could, in what it considered a sound trade policy, not only interdict a substantial part of the economic life of one section of Canada but do so for the benefit of that of another. Whatever the scope of the regulation of interprovincial trade, it is hard to conceive a more insidious form of encroachment on a complementary jurisdiction.

- in citing the Labour Conventions Reference, the Board noted that the issue fell within the provincial power over property and civil rights
- s. 95 did not apply, as the Act did not interfere with the agricultural operations of farmers

== See also ==
- McCray v. United States: US case on margarine food coloring
- Walter Rau Lebensmittelwerke v De Smedt PVBA: European case on margarine packaging
- List of Supreme Court of Canada cases (Richards Court through Fauteux Court)
