= Proprietary Articles Trade Association v Canada (AG) =

Canadian constitutional law case in the JCPC

- Court: Judicial Committee of the Privy Council
- Full case name: The Proprietary Articles Trade Association and others v The Attorney-General of Canada and others
- Decided: January 29, 1931
- Citations: [1931] UKPC 11 (BAILII), [1931] AC 310, [1931] 2 DLR 1, [1931] 1 WWR 552, 55 CCC 241

Case history
- Prior actions: Reference re Validity of the Combines Investigation Act and of s. 498 of the Criminal Code, 1929 CanLII 90, [1929] SCR 409 (30 April 1929)
- Appealed from: Supreme Court of Canada

Court membership
- Judges sitting: Lord Blanesburgh, Lord Merrivale, Lord Atkin, Lord Russell of Killowen, Lord Macmillan

Case opinions
- Decision by: Lord Atkin

Proprietary Articles Trade Association v Canada (AG), is a Canadian constitutional decision of the Judicial Committee of the Privy Council on the Constitution's criminal law power under section 91(27).

== Background ==
Following the Board of Commerce case (in which the Privy Council determined that two Acts were ultra vires federal jurisdiction), the Parliament of Canada passed the Combines Investigation Act, 1923, which provided for:

- the investigation of alleged combines,
- creating and punishing the offence of assisting in the formation or operation of a combine,
- reduction or abolition of customs duties which facilitate disadvantage to the public from an existing combine, and
- revocation of patents in certain cases.

The Criminal Code was also amended by inserting s. 498, which created a corresponding offence of combining to limit facilities, restrain commerce, or lessen manufacture or competition. These measures essentially repeated the previous legislation, without employing the regulatory framework that had previously been found to be unconstitutional.

The Proprietary Articles Trade Association was formed in Canada in 1925, with objects similar to organizations of the same name formed in several other Commonwealth countries. It was investigated under the Act, and found to be a combine within its scope.

The following reference questions were posed to the Supreme Court of Canada:

1. Is the Combines Investigation Act, R.S.C., 1927, chapter 26, ultra vires the Parliament of Canada, either in whole or in part, and, if so, in what particular or particulars or to what extent?
2. Is section 498 of the Criminal Code ultra vires the Parliament of Canada, and, if so, in what particular or particulars or to what extent?

== At the Supreme Court of Canada ==
The Supreme Court unanimously held that both measures were intra vires federal jurisdiction, by virtue of the federal criminal law power. As to Lord Haldane's restrictive interpretation that had been previously enunciated in the Board of Commerce case, Newcombe J said:

I am convinced that he never intended to suggest that Parliament might not competently find a public wrong lurking or tolerated under the head of civil rights in a province which it is necessary or expedient, according to its will and discretion, or, using Sir Matthew Hale’s expression, “by the prudence of law-givers,” to suppress, in the exercise of its authority over the criminal law.

== At the Privy Council ==
The Board upheld the Supreme Court ruling. In his judgment, Lord Atkin rejected Lord Haldane's previous interpretation of criminal law in Canada, as it froze the scope of criminal law to what was considered criminal at the time of Confederation in 1867. He endorsed Newcombe J's view of the matter. Instead, Atkin offered a new definition:

Criminal law connotes only the quality of such acts or omissions as are prohibited under appropriate penal provisions by authority of the state. The criminal quality of an act cannot be discerned by intuition; nor can it be discovered by reference to any standard but one: Is the act prohibited with penal consequences?

This statement suggested two requirements for criminal law. It must consist of a prohibition and must impose a prison sentence.

While not having to decide on the applicability of the trade and commerce power in this, the Board expressed a desire to clarify an aspect of their previous ruling in Board of Commerce. In the current case, it had been argued that Board of Commerce held that the trade and commerce power could be used only in furtherance of a general power that the Parliament of Canada had independently of it. It was emphasized that that was not the correct interpretation, and that the power existed as a separate grant of authority.

== Aftermath ==
Atkin's definition of what criminal law is has had a lasting impact throughout Commonwealth jurisprudence. In Canadian constitutional law, it was subsequently refined in 1949 in the Margarine Reference case to more properly reflect the Canadian division of powers.

== See also ==
- List of Judicial Committee of the Privy Council cases
