= Johanne Gauthier =

Federal Court of Appeal judge (born 1955)

Judge of the Federal Court of Appeal
- Incumbent
- Assumed office October 21, 2011

Judge of the Federal Court of Canada
- In office July 2, 2003 – October 21, 2011

Personal details
- Born: September 11, 1955 (age 71) Montreal, Quebec
- Education: University of Montreal

Johanne Gauthier (born September 11, 1955) is a former judge serving on the Federal Court of Appeal from October 21, 2011 to September 1, 2023.

Gauthier was appointed to her position as a Federal Court judge by Prime Minister Jean Chretien on December 11, 2002. During this time, Gauthier also served on the Competition Tribunal from November 26, 2009 to when she was appointed to the Federal Court of Appeal.

Gauthier was appointed to the Federal Court of Appeal by Prime Minister Stephen Harper on October 21, 2011. She remained in this position until September 1, 2023.

Gauthier was the first woman to be president of the Canadian Maritime Law Association.
