= François Lemieux =

Judge of the Federal Court of Canada
- In office January 21, 1999 – October 5, 2012

Personal details
- Born: October 5, 1937 (age 88) Toronto, Ontario

François Lemieux (born October 5, 1937) is a judge who served on the Federal Court of Canada from 1999 to 2012.
