= Hunter v Southam Inc =

- Supreme Court of Canada

Hearing: November 22, 1983 Judgment: September 17, 1984
- Full case name: Lawson A. W. Hunter, Director of Investigation and Research of the Combines Investigation Branch, Michael J. Milton, Michael L. Murphy, J. Andrew McAlpine, and Antonio P. Marrocco, also known as Anthony P. Marroco v Southam Inc.
- Citations: [1984] 2 SCR 145, 55 NR 241, 11 DLR (4th) 641, [1984] 6 WWR 577, 33 Alta LR (2d) 193, 55 AR 291, 14 CCC (3d) 97, 41 CR (3d) 97, 27 BLR 297, 2 CPR (3d) 1, 9 CRR 355, 84 DTC 6467
- Docket No.: 17569
- Prior history: on appeal from the Court of Appeal for Alberta
- Ruling: Hunter appeal dismissed

Court membership
- Chief Justice: Bora Laskin; Puisne Justices: Roland Ritchie, Brian Dickson, Jean Beetz, Willard Estey, William McIntyre, Julien Chouinard, Antonio Lamer, Bertha Wilson

Reasons given
- Unanimous reasons by: Dickson J.
- Laskin C.J. took no part in the consideration or decision of the case.

Hunter v Southam Inc [1984] 2 S.C.R. 145 is a landmark Supreme Court of Canada privacy rights case and as well is the first Supreme Court decision to consider section 8 of the Canadian Charter of Rights and Freedoms.

== Background ==
An investigation was begun by the government under the authority of the Combines Investigation Act into Southam Newspaper. The investigators entered Southam's offices in Edmonton and elsewhere to examine documents. The search was authorized prior to the enactment of the Charter but the search did not commence until afterwards. The challenge was allowed.

At the Alberta Court of Appeal, the judge found that part of the Act was inconsistent with the Charter and therefore of no force or effect.

The Supreme Court considered section 8 for the first time and upheld the ruling of the Court of Appeal.

== Reasons of the court ==
Justice Dickson (as he then was), writing for a unanimous Court, held that the Combines Investigation Act violated the Charter as it did not provide an appropriate standard for administering warrants.

The Court held that the purpose of section 8 is to protect an individual's reasonable expectation of privacy, and to limit government action that will encroach on that expectation. Furthermore, to assess the extent of those rights the right to privacy must be balanced against the government's duty to enforce the law.

In reaffirming the doctrine of purposive interpretation when reading the Constitution, Dickson goes on to make a fundamental and often quoted statement of the purpose of the Constitution and how it should be interpreted, stating:

The task of expounding a constitution is crucially different from that of construing a statute. A statute defines present rights and obligations. It is easily enacted and as easily repealed. A constitution, by contrast, is drafted with an eye to the future. Its function is to provide a continuing framework for the legitimate exercise of governmental power and, when joined by a Bill or a Charter of Rights, for the unremitting protection of individual rights and liberties. Once enacted, its provisions cannot easily be repealed or amended. It must, therefore, be capable of growth and development over time to meet new social, political and historical realities often unimagined by its framers. The judiciary is the guardian of the constitution and must, in interpreting its provisions, bear these considerations in mind. Professor Paul Freund expressed this idea aptly when he admonished the American courts 'not to read the provisions of the Constitution like a last will and testament lest it become one'.

— p. 155
