= Francis C. Muldoon =

Canadian judge

The Honourable Francis Creighton Muldoon (1930 - January 9, 2013) was a Canadian judge of the Federal Court of Canada from July 18, 1983 until September 4, 2001.

Muldoon was born in Winnipeg, Manitoba, in 1930. He practiced law for fourteen years and served as a Bencher of the Law Society of Manitoba from 1969-1971. He was appointed Chairman of the Manitoba Law Reform Commission in 1970; he was named Vice-President, 1977, and later President of the Law Reform Commission of Canada.

Muldoon joined the bench of the trial division of the Federal Court of Canada and the Court Martial Appeal Court in 1983.
