= Justice Simpson =

Justice Simpson may refer to:

- A. H. Simpson (1843–1918), justice of the Supreme Court of New South Wales
- Carolyn Simpson (born 1946), justice of the Supreme Court of New South Wales
- David F. Simpson (1860–1925), associate justice of the Minnesota Supreme Court
- George B. Simpson (c. 1882–1954), associate justice of the Washington Supreme Court
- Gordon Simpson (judge) (1894–1987), justice of the Texas Supreme Court
- Jesse L. Simpson (1884–1973), chief justice of the Illinois Supreme Court
- R. T. Simpson (1837–1912), associate justice of the Alabama Supreme Court
- Robert Tennent Simpson Jr. (1893–1974), associate justice of the Alabama Supreme Court
- William Dunlap Simpson (1823–1890), chief justice of the South Carolina Supreme Court
- William Simpson (Australian judge) (1894–1966), justice of the Supreme Court of the Australian Capital Territory

== See also ==
- Judge Simpson (disambiguation)
