= Jocelyne Gagné =

Canadian judge

Jocelyne Gagné is a Justice of the Federal Court of Canada, having been its Associate Chief Justice from December 12, 2018 to July 31, 2024. Prior to her appointment she had served as president of the Commercial Litigation Committee of the Canadian Bar Association.

In April 2026, Gagné granted a last-minute stay of deportation for Jaskirat Singh Sidhu, the driver in the Humboldt Broncos bus crash, temporarily halting his removal to India. The emergency order paused the deportation while the court reviewed a legal challenge to the Canada Border Services Agency, which had refused to delay his removal as he sought to remain in Canada on humanitarian and compassionate grounds.
