= Competition Act =

Canadian federal law governing competition in Canada

Parliament of Canada
- Long title: An Act to provide for the general regulation of trade and commerce in respect of conspiracies, trade practices and mergers affecting competition
- Citation: R.S.C., 1985, c. C-34
- Enacted by: Parliament of Canada
- Commenced: 19 June 1986
- Status: In force

The Competition Act (French: Loi sur la concurrence) is a Canadian federal law governing competition in Canada. The Act contains both criminal and civil provisions aimed at preventing anti-competitive practices in the marketplace.

Along with the Competition Tribunal Act, the Competition Act forms the statutory basis of current federal competition policy in Canada.

The Act is enforced and administered by the Competition Bureau, and cases are adjudicated by the Competition Tribunal.

== History ==
=== Background ===
The first legislation in Canada dealing with competition was the Anti-Combines Act, introduced in May 1889 as the first antitrust statute in the industrial world, preceding the American Sherman Antitrust Act. The legislation prohibited conspiracies and agreements by businesses in restraint of trade.

Two years later, anti-combines provisions were mostly incorporated into the Canadian Criminal Code. In 1912, the Supreme Court of Canada ruled in Weidman v Shragge that the purpose of the anti-combines provisions in the Criminal Code was to protect public interest in free competition.

Canadian competition and anti-combines laws since 1889 would go through several different iterations, starting with the Combines Investigation Act, 1910, which replaced the 1889 Anti-Combines Act, eventually leading to the Combines Investigation Act, 1923 and 1937.

The anti-trust provisions incorporated into the Criminal Code in 1891 would remain until 1960 with an amendment to the Combines Investigation Act.

=== Competition Act ===
In 1985, the Progressive Conservative government of Brian Mulroney replaced the Combines Investigation Act, 1923, with the Competition Act, which came into effect on June 19, 1986. The provisions in this Act regarding civil mergers, which deal with both horizontal and vertical mergers, replaced the ineffectual Criminal Code provisions under which only a handful of cases were brought between 1910 and 1976.

In April 1996, a set of amendments to the Competition Act was introduced into Parliament, but died on the Order Paper. The bill was changed and reintroduced as Bill C-20 on 20 November 1997, and after being amended, received third reading in the House of Commons on 23 September 1998. The proposed amendments dealt with deceptive telemarketing, judicially-authorized interception of private communications for a few criminal offences, new civil provisions for misleading advertising, improvements to the merger prenotification process, and clarification of the provisions for regular price claims.

In 2002, several changes were made to the Competition Act and the Competition Tribunal Act. For instance, private parties were given the right to initiate proceedings before the Competition Tribunal in certain cases. The Tribunal could also hear references filed pursuant to section 124.2 of the Competition Act and award costs of proceedings before it.

Significant amendments to the Act in March 2009 and March 2010 led to several criminal offences being repealed and/or converted into reviewable practices. As a result, only two criminal-offence provisions exist in the Competition Act: conspiracy and bid-rigging, which are illegal per se.

The Act was again amended on June 23, 2022, as part of Canada's Budget Implementation Act, 2022 (Bill C-19). On November 17, 2022, with the intention to modernize the Act, François-Philippe Champagne, Minister of Innovation, Science and Industry, commenced a review of the Competition Act. The Affordable Housing and Groceries Act (Bill C-56), tabled on 21 September 2023, proposes three Competition Act changes including removal of the "efficiencies defence" in merger cases.

== Application and administration ==
The Competition Act contains both criminal and civil provisions aimed at preventing anti-competitive practices in the marketplace. The Act applies to all economic activities (both goods and services) except those specifically exempted—e.g., collective bargaining, amateur sports, securities underwriting, or activities subject to other legislation (such as industries where price or output, or both, are regulated by federal or provincial governments).

The Competition Act defines a "merger" as the acquisition or establishment—whether by purchase or lease of shares or assets, or by amalgamation, combination or otherwise—of control over or a significant interest in all or part of a business.

Since 2010, only two criminal-offence provisions exist in the Competition Act: conspiracy and bid-rigging, which are illegal per se (i.e., the effect that such conduct has on competition is irrelevant).

The administration and enforcement of the Competition Act is done by the Competition Bureau, headed by the Commissioner of Competition. The Bureau is also responsible for the administration and enforcement of the Consumer Packaging and Labelling Act (for non-food products), the Textile Labelling Act, and the Precious Metals Marking Act.

The Competition Tribunal is a specialized administrative body that has exclusive jurisdiction to hear certain competition matters.

== Cases ==
During the 1980 and 1990s, fines in conspiracy cases (sections 45–47) increased greatly.

A record fine was obtained on 27 May 1998 when US-based Archer Daniels Midland (ADM) pleaded guilty and paid $14 million in fines for a conspiracy involving lysine and $2 million for one involving citric acid. The fines amounted to 29.2% and 11.8% respectively of ADM's sales in Canada during the conspiracy.

== See also ==
- Competition Bureau
- Competition Tribunal
- Combines Investigation Act
- Competition Act 1998 - UK
