= Walter Rau Lebensmittelwerke v De Smedt PVBA =

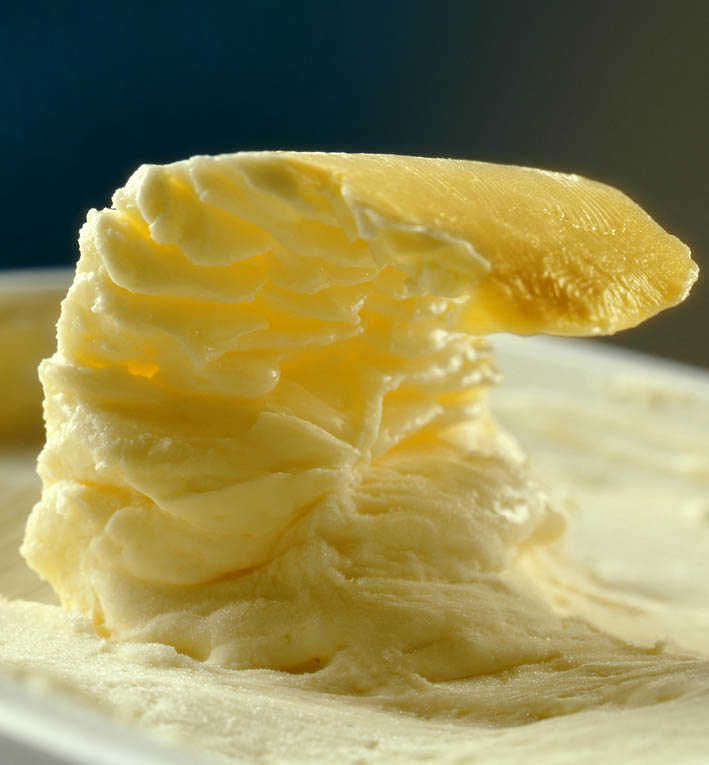
- Court: European Court of Justice
- Citation: (1983) Case 261/81

Keywords
- Free movement of goods

Walter Rau Lebensmittelwerke v De Smedt PVBA (1983) Case 261/81 is an EU law case, concerning the free movement of goods in the European Union.

== Facts ==
A Belgian law required margarine to be marketed in cube shaped packages, to avoid confusion with butter. This was applied to all kinds, domestic and imports. Walter Rau argued that the law contravened (what is now) TFEU article 34.

== Judgment ==
The ECJ held that the measure was not lawful. In principle packaging requirements to prevents consumers being confused would be justified. But it must be ‘also necessary for such rules to be proportionate to the aim in view.’

17. It cannot be reasonably denied that in principle legislation designed to prevent butter and margarine from being confused in the mind of the consumer is justified. However, the application by one member state to margarine lawfully manufactured and marketed in another member state of legislation which prescribes for that product a specific kind of packaging such as the cubic form to the exclusion of any other form of packaging considerably exceeds the requirements of the object in view. Consumers may in fact be protected just as effectively by other measures, for example by rules on labelling, which hinder the free movement of goods less.

== See also ==
- Canadian Federation of Agriculture v Quebec (AG): Canadian case on banning margarine
- McCray v. United States: US case on margarine food coloring
- European Union law
