= McCray v. United States =

1904 United States Supreme Court case

- Supreme Court of the United States

Argued December 2, 1903 Decided May 31, 1904
- Full case name: McCray v. United States
- Citations: 195 U.S. 27 (more)

Court membership
- Chief Justice Melville Fuller Associate Justices John M. Harlan · David J. Brewer; Henry B. Brown · Edward D. White; Rufus W. Peckham · Joseph McKenna; Oliver W. Holmes Jr. · William R. Day

Case opinions
- Majority: White, joined by Harlan, Brewer, McKenna, Holmes, Day
- Dissent: Fuller, Brown, Peckham (without written opinion)

McCray v. United States, 195 U.S. 27 (1904), was a 1904 case decided by the Supreme Court of the United States that greenlighted the use of the federal taxing power for regulatory purposes. The Court upheld by a 6–3 vote a federal tax on colored oleomargarine, rejecting contentions that it exceeded Congressional authority. The decision, authored by Justice Edward Douglass White, effectively allowed Congress to regulate intrastate commercial activity by levying taxes on the activity. The justices in the majority refused to examine Congress's motives, instead ruling that the tax was valid because, regardless of the intent behind it, its effect was to raise revenue. Chief Justice Melville Fuller dissented from the decision, which curtailed his own previous opinion in the 1895 case of United States v. E. C. Knight Co. and showed that Fuller's support for a limited federal government could not always garner the support of a majority of the Court. McCray also argued the tax violated his fundamental rights. Justice White did address the fundamental rights argument warning taxes cannot be used to destroy fundamental rights argument stating "...where it was plain to the judicial mind that the [taxing] power had been called into play not for revenue, but solely for the purpose of destroying rights which could not be rightfully destroyed...such an arbitrary act was not merely an abuse of a delegated power, but was the exercise of an authority not conferred." McCray 195 U.S. 64.

== Background ==
In the 19th century, chemists in France developed oleomargarine as a substitute for butter. Because oleomargarine was naturally white, which was thought to be unappetizing, manufacturers began adding yellow color to it. Dairy farmers, who were in competition with the product, claimed that coloring it was a deceptive practice, and sought federal legislation to provide competition. Congress enacted a statute to tax colored oleomargarine at a rate of 10 cents per pound, which would effectively destroy the market for that product. Uncolored oleomargarine was taxed at 1/4¢ per pound. McCray, a seller of oleomargarine, sued to have the tax deemed unconstitutional as a deprivation of due process and a violation of his fundamental right to sell at the lower tax rate.

== See also ==
- Canadian Federation of Agriculture v Quebec (AG): Canadian case on banning margarine
- Walter Rau Lebensmittelwerke v De Smedt PVBA: European case on margarine packaging
