= Robert L. Barnes =

Canadian judge

Judge of the Federal Court of Canada
- Incumbent
- Assumed office November 22, 2005

Personal details
- Born: British Columbia

Robert L. Barnes is a retired judge who served on the Federal Court of Canada from November 2005 until November 2021.

== Personal life ==
Barnes was born in New Westminster, British Columbia in 1951.

== Education ==
He received degrees from Acadia University and Dalhousie University in Nova Scotia.

== Career ==
In 1978, Barnes was called to the bar in British Columbia and Nova Scotia, and was appointed as Queens Counsel in 1995. Barnes became a Judge of the Federal Court in 2005, and Judge of the Court Martial Appeal Court of Canada in 2006, and a judicial member of the Competition Tribunal in 2015.

== Red Cross ==
Barnes was the vice-president of the International Federation of Red Cross and Red Crescent Societies from 2004 to 2005 and was president of the Canadian Red Cross Society from 2001 to 2004.
