= Sandra J. Simpson =

Judge of the Federal Court of Canada
- In office June 10, 1993 – June 10, 2022

Sandra J. Simpson is a former judge of the Federal Court of Canada.
