= Courts martial of Canada =

Courts martial of Canada are trials conducted by the Canadian Armed Forces. Such courts martial are authorized under the National Defence Act. Civilians with a military unit also become subject to the courts-martial system.

Most commonly, courts martial are convened to try members of the Canadian military for criminal violations of the Code of Service Discipline, which is the Canadian military's criminal code. The constitutionality of military courts martial was upheld by the Supreme Court of Canada in R v Généreux, but changes were mandated to ensure judicial independence. It was also determined that off-duty conduct can also fall under a court martial.

Since 2014, decisions of Canada's courts martial have been available online.

Decisions of Canadian courts martial can be appealed to the Court Martial Appeal Court of Canada, a body made up of civilian judges, with a further appeal to the Supreme Court of Canada, by leave of the Supreme Court.
