= Eleanor Dawson =

Judge of the Federal Court of Canada
- In office July 2, 2003 – December 27, 2009

Judge of the Federal Court of Appeals
- In office December 28, 2009 – September 2020
- Preceded by: C. Michael Ryer

Personal details
- Born: Burnaby, British Columbia
- Education: University of Manitoba

Eleanor Dawson is a judge who served on the Federal Court of Appeal from 2009 to 2020, and is a former judge on the Federal Court of Canada.
