= Board of Commerce case =

- Court: Judicial Committee of the Privy Council
- Full case name: The Attorney General of Canada v The Attorney General of Alberta and others
- Decided: November 8, 1921
- Citation: [1921] UKPC 107, [1922] 1 A.C. 191

Case history
- Prior actions: In re Board of Commerce, 1920 CanLII 66, [1920] SCR 456 (1 June 1920)
- Appealed from: Supreme Court of Canada

Court membership
- Judges sitting: Viscount Haldane, Lord Buckmaster, Viscount Cave, Lord Phillimore, Lord Carson

Case opinions
- Decision by: Viscount Haldane

Re Board of Commerce Act 1919 and the Combines and Fair Prices Act 1919, commonly known as the Board of Commerce case, is a Canadian constitutional decision of the Judicial Committee of the Privy Council in which the "emergency doctrine" under the federal power of peace, order and good government was first created.

== Background ==
Following the end of the First World War, there was a rapid rise in the cost of living in the Canadian economy. In response, the Parliament of Canada passed the Board of Commerce Act, 1919 and the Combines and Fair Prices Act, 1919. The assigned the Board of Commerce two main functions:

- Investigate and restrain combinations, monopolies, trusts and mergers constituting a "combine."
- Inquire into and enforce prohibitions against hoarding and profiteering.

In pursuit of its functions, the Board issued an order, prohibiting certain clothing manufacturers in Ottawa from charging higher than specified profit margins. That triggered a dispute as to the Acts' constitutionality, and the Board referred the matter to the Supreme Court of Canada by way of stated case under s. 32 of the Board of Commerce Act, posing the following reference questions:

1. Has the Board lawful authority to make the order?
2. Has the Board lawful authority to require the Registrar or other proper officer of the Supreme Court of Ontario to cause the order when issued to be made a rule of said Court?

== Supreme Court of Canada ==
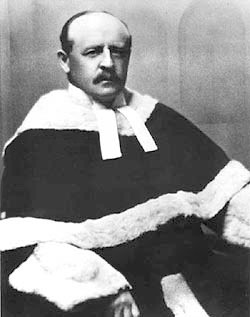
Anglin J

The Supreme Court split 3–3 on the question of the constitutionality of the legislation. Anglin J, joined by Davies CJ and Mignault J considered the Acts to be intra vires and repeated the observation he had previously made in the Insurance Act Reference:

When a matter primarily of civil rights has attained such dimensions that it affects the body politic of the Dominion and has become of national concern it has in that aspect of it, not only ceased to be "local and provincial" but has also lost its character as a matter of "civil rights in the province" and has thus so far ceased to be subject to provincial jurisdiction that Dominion legislation upon it under the "peace, order and good government" provision does not trench upon the exclusive provincial field and is, therefore, valid and paramount.

However, given the Privy Council's rulings in Citizen's Insurance Co. v. Parsons and the Local Prohibition case, he rested his decision to uphold the Acts on the basis of the federal trade and commerce power as well as on the federal power relating to peace, order and good government.

Idington, Duff, and Brodeur JJ, in separate opinions, held that they were ultra vires. In particular, Duff J had concerns as to the interpretation of the nature of the power of peace, order and good government:

In truth if this legislation can be sustained under the residuary clause, it is not easy to put a limit to the extent to which Parliament through the instrumentality of commissions (having a large discretion in assigning the limits of their own jurisdiction, see sec. 16), may from time to time in the vicissitudes of national trade, times of high prices, times of stagnation and low prices and so on, supersede the authority of the provincial legislatures. I am not convinced that it is a proper application of the reasoning to be found in the judgments on the subject of the drink legislation, to draw from it conclusions which would justify Parliament in any conceivable circumstance forcing upon a province a system of nationalization of industry.

An appeal was then filed with the Privy Council.

== Privy Council ==
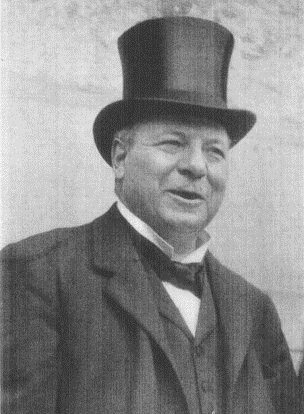
Lord Haldane

Lord Haldane, for the Council, found that the Acts were ultra vires the jurisdiction of the Parliament of Canada, as they could not be justified under any heading of federal power enumerated in s. 91 of the British North America Act, 1867.

=== Peace, order and good government ===
Haldane rejected the general power of peace, order and good government on the basis that it should be used only in circumstances "such as those of war or famine [where] the peace, order, and good Government of the Dominion might be imperilled under conditions so exceptional that they require legislation of a character in reality beyond anything provided for by the enumerated heads in either section 92 or section 91 itself."

=== Trade and commerce ===
Citing his previous decision in John Deere v Wharton, Haldane held that the power to regulate trade and commerce was meaningless unless it could be said to supplement another federal power.

=== Criminal law ===
In explaining why the federal criminal law power was not of help in the matter, Haldane also provided its first definition in Canadian jurisprudence by stating that it would apply "where the subject matter is one which by its very nature belongs to the domain of criminal jurisprudence."

== Aftermath ==
Haldane's statement as to the nature of the criminal law power was later described by Lord Atkin in Proprietary Articles Trade Association v. Attorney General of Canada as not being a definition. Instead, it was held to be "the criminal law in its widest sense," including the ability to make new crimes, and the only relevant standard to apply is whether the act would attract penal consequences. In addition, while the matter of the trade and commerce power did not need to be decided in that case, the Board declared that it wished to dissociate themselves from Haldane's previous comment: "No such restriction is properly to be inferred from that judgment."

== See also ==
- Combines Investigation Act
