= Donald J. Rennie =

Canadian jurist

Donald J. Rennie is a justice with the Federal Court of Appeal of Canada. He is also Chairman of the Canadian Competition Tribunal. Previously, he served as a justice with the Federal Court of Canada. Prior to his appointment to the bench, he was a Justice Assistant Deputy Attorney General with the Department of Justice in Ottawa.

Education: B.A. History (Hon.), University of Guelph; law degree, Dalhousie University. The University of Guelph conferred an honorary doctorate on Rennie.
