= Canadian Anti-Fraud Centre =

Canadian national fraud reporting centre

Agency overview
- Formed: January 1993
- Preceding agency: PhoneBusters National Call Centre
- Parent Agencies: Ontario Provincial Police; Royal Canadian Mounted Police; Competition Bureau
- Website: antifraudcentre-centreantifraude.ca

The Canadian Anti-Fraud Centre (CAFC; formerly known as PhoneBusters National Call Centre) is Canada's national anti-fraud police service and central fraud data repository. It was established in January 1993 in North Bay, Ontario, and is jointly operated by the Ontario Provincial Police, Royal Canadian Mounted Police and the Competition Bureau.

The centre's mandate includes gathering intelligence and receiving complaints on mass marketing fraud (e.g., Nigerian Letter scam), identity theft, deceptive marketing practices, and telemarketing frauds. Once received, the centre analyzes the data, disseminates victim evidence, statistics, and documentation, and prepares reports for other law enforcement agencies in Canada and the United States to follow up.

Investigating fraud is the role of local police; the CAFC supports them by sharing the information collected through reports. Victims and witnesses can report to the centre online, anonymously if they choose, or by telephone, and cybercrime reports made to the centre are shared with the National Cybercrime Coordination Centre (NC3). In 2025 the centre received more than 112,000 fraud reports involving over $704 million in reported losses. According to the centre and its partners, only 5 to 10 per cent of frauds are reported.

It also educates and provides awareness campaign on fraud prevention and telemarketing pitches, particularly in March (Fraud Prevention Month) to prevent future victimization.

Previous logo

== History ==
The centre was established in January 1993 as Project PhoneBusters in North Bay, Ontario. The project was co-ordinated by the OPP and drew staff and funding from the RCMP, Industry Canada, Ontario and Alberta provincial ministries, the Canadian Bankers Association, the Canadian Courier Association and the Better Business Bureaus.

The original mandate of PhoneBusters was to prosecute key individuals in Ontario and Quebec involved in telemarketing fraud under the Criminal Code.

In 1991, Detective Staff Sergeant Barry Elliott of the Ontario Provincial Police Anti-Rackets Branch in North Bay began a six-month investigation that gathered telemarketing fraud complaints from across Canada in one place. It found that 99 per cent of the suspect telemarketing companies were operating out of Montreal.

It began under the Supervision of Staff Sergeant Ray Duguay, Ontario Provincial Police, North Bay Anti-Rackets Field Unit O.I.C. Sergeant Barry Elliott took an interest in the new phenomenon of fraudulent pen sales and fridge magnets to businesses promising free vacation trips that never were fulfilled. He began a collection process of victims and their documents throughout the Province of Ontario and filling many banker’s boxes while maintaining his regular caseload. Elliott requested assistance from the OPP District Headquarters and Constable David McClocklin was seconded full-time to the mail and telephone fraud. The two worked together and discovered patterns, similarities, and a disturbing number of Canadian victims from coast to coast. It soon became clear that this type of fraud knew no boundaries and would require many strategic partnerships along its journey. What began as one man’s interest and another man’s natural intelligence analysis, helped form the Canadian Anti-Fraud Centre, which is jointly managed by the Royal Canadian Mounted Police, the Ontario Provincial Police and the Competition Bureau.

A SeniorBusters program, in which volunteers who are seniors themselves give fraud-prevention presentations and contact older victims, was added in 1997. A memorandum of understanding signed with the OPP in 2001 made the RCMP a contributing partner, and the project was renamed the PhoneBusters National Call Centre. The Competition Bureau became the third partner in 2006, and in 2010 the centre was renamed the Canadian Anti-Fraud Centre to reflect that its scope had expanded beyond telemarketing fraud.
