= Competition Bureau =

Canadian government agency

Competition Bureau Bureau de la concurrence

Agency overview
- Employees: 527
- Annual budget: $58,884,257 (2024-2025)

Jurisdictional structure
- Federal agency: Canada
- Operations jurisdiction: Canada
- Governing body: Innovation, Science and Economic Development Canada
- Constituting instrument: Competition Act
- General nature: Federal law enforcement

Operational structure
- Elected officer responsible: Melanie Joly, Minister of Industry
- Agency executive: Jeanne Pratt, Commissioner of Competition

Website
- Competition Bureau Homepage

The Competition Bureau (French: Bureau de la concurrence) is the independent law enforcement agency in charge of regulating competition in Canada, responsible for ensuring that markets operate in a competitive manner.

Headed by the Commissioner of Competition, the agency is responsible for the administration and enforcement of the Competition Act, as well as the Consumer Packaging and Labelling Act (except as it relates to food), Textile Labelling Act, and the Precious Metals Marking Act.

The Bureau falls within the scope of Innovation, Science and Economic Development Canada, and its minister.

== Commissioner of Competition ==
The Competition Bureau is headed by the Commissioner of Competition.

Under the Competition Act, the Commissioner can launch inquiries, challenge civil and merger matters before the Competition Tribunal, make recommendations on criminal matters to the Public Prosecution Service of Canada, and intervene as a competition advocate before federal and provincial bodies.

As head of the Competition Bureau, the Commissioner leads the Bureau's participation in international forums such as the Organisation for Economic Co-operation and Development (OECD) and the International Competition Network (ICN), to develop and promote coordinated competition laws and policies in an increasingly globalized marketplace.

== Branches and operations ==
Most branches of the Bureau are headed by a Senior Deputy Commissioner, with directorates that fall under a Deputy Commissioner.

In addition to its main operations, the Competition Bureau also jointly manages the Canadian Anti-Fraud Centre (CAFC), in partnership with the Royal Canadian Mounted Police and the Ontario Provincial Police.

Under the Competition Act, the Competition Bureau can also challenge civil and merger matters before the Competition Tribunal.

=== Mergers and Monopolistic Practices ===
The Competition Bureau has the authority to review any corporate merger in Canada.

This role falls under the Bureau's Mergers and Monopolistic Practices Branch, headed by a Senior Deputy Commissioner.

The Mergers and Monopolistic Practices Branch reviews proposed merger transactions and investigates practices that could negatively impact competition. The branch's Mergers Directorate reviews proposed mergers in order to determine whether it is likely to result in a substantial lessening or prevention of competition in the Canadian marketplace. The Monopolistic Practices Directorate, on the other hand, detects, investigates, and deters business practices that "have a negative impact on competition, such as abuse of dominance, as well as certain types of anti‑competitive agreements or arrangements between competitors."

=== Cartels and Deceptive Marketing Practices ===
Under the Competition Act, it is a criminal offence to engage in an illegal agreement (such as price fixing, market allocation, bid-rigging), cartel, or conspiracy. Under the Act, it is also against the law to falsely or misleadingly advertise or market something.

The Bureau's Cartels and Deceptive Marketing Practices Branch is responsible for fighting such practices.

The branch's Cartels Directorate is in charge of detecting, investigating, and deterring significant cartels—including conspiracies, agreements, or arrangements among competitors and potential competitors to fix prices, rig bids, allocate markets, or restrict supply.

The branch's Deceptive Marketing Practices Directorate is in charge of detecting, investigating, and deterring false or misleading representations and deceptive marketing practices identified under the Competition Act. The directorate also enforces related legislation, i.e. the Consumer Packaging and Labelling Act (except in relation to food), the Precious Metals Marking Act, and the Textile Labelling Act.

=== Competition Promotion ===
One of the Bureau's responsibilities is to help foster a "competitive and innovative" marketplace.

This role falls under the Competition Promotion Branch, which is headed by a Deputy Commissioner, tasked with "encouraging the adoption of pro-competition positions, policies, and behaviours by businesses, consumers, regulators, government and international partners." The branch also leads the Bureau's planning and reporting processes.

Also within this branch is the International Affairs Directorate, which establishes working relationships with foreign competition law agencies and tribunals.

The branch is divided into several subdivisions.

- The Compliance Unit, headed by the Director of Compliance, is in charge of promoting compliance with the 4 relevant acts under the Competition Bureau's purview. It does this by evaluating corporate compliance programs, promoting compliance in the market, and sharing resources with "domestic and international enforcers and regulators."
- The Economic Analysis Directorate, headed by an Associate Deputy Commissioner, is in charge of providing "economic analysis and advice to support the Bureau’s enforcement investigations."
- The International Affairs Directorate, headed by an Associate Deputy Commissioner, is responsible for fostering "strong relationships with key international partners to advance and reinforce the Bureau’s enforcement priorities and coordinates international efforts to promote competitive markets and effective competition law enforcement."
- The Policy, Planning and Advocacy Directorate, headed by an Associate Deputy Commissioner, is tasked with providing "input into departmental and government-wide policy initiatives," and leading the Bureau’s Parliamentary relations, "as well as its integrated planning, monitoring and reporting exercises."
- The Public Affairs and Outreach Directorate is in charge of communicating "the Bureau’s activities and priorities to Canadians," as well as supporting and coordinating "the Bureau’s outreach activities to consumers, businesses and stakeholders."

=== Digital Enforcement and Intelligence ===
The Digital Enforcement and Intelligence Branch provides "expertise on digital business practices and technologies," as well as "intelligence expertise for all directorates at the Competition Bureau." The branch oversees "Competition through Analytics, Research and Intelligence", or "CANARI".

The branch's Intelligence Directorate "provides intelligence expertise to the Bureau’s enforcement and promotion directorates, as well as expertise relating to behavioural economics and remedies." Also under this branch is the Digital Enforcement Directorate, which is provides "expertise on how companies use technology and data in the marketplace, and how the Bureau can use technology and data to enhance our enforcement and promotion work."

=== Corporate Services ===
The Bureau also has a Corporate Services Branch, headed by an Executive Director, which provides support services to the Bureau. These services include support for the agency's financial, asset, information management, and human resource activities, as well as matters related to access to information, privacy, values and ethics, security, and procurement.

This branch also handles legal-related services under:

- the Competition Bureau Legal Services office of the Department of Justice, who provides legal services to the Commissioner and represents the Commissioner "on all matters other than those for which the Public Prosecution Service of Canada (PPSC) is responsible."
- the Competition Law Section of PPSC, who is "responsible for initiating and conducting criminal prosecutions on behalf of the Attorney General of Canada and for advising the bureau on criminal investigations."

== See also ==
- Bread price-fixing in Canada
- Canadian Anti-Fraud Centre
- Competition Tribunal
