= Barry Strayer =

Canadian judge (1932–2022)

Barry Lee Strayer, OC (August 13, 1932 – December 3, 2022) was a Canadian judge who served as a Justice of the Canadian Federal Court of Appeal and later as a Deputy Judge of the Federal Court of Canada. He is known as one of the instrumental drafters of the Canadian Charter of Rights and Freedoms.

Strayer was born in Moose Jaw, Saskatchewan. In 1959, Strayer graduated from the faculty of law at the University of Saskatchewan. He worked at the Department of Justice in Saskatchewan until 1963 at which point he began teaching at the University of Saskatchewan. He eventually became the Director of the Constitutional Law Division of the Privy Council Office. In 1974, he was appointed Assistant Deputy Minister of Justice where he spent several years working on first drafts of the Charter.

In 2008, he was made an Officer of the Order of Canada.

Strayer died on December 3, 2022 in Ottawa, at the age of 90.

Legal offices
Preceded by Patrick Mahoney	Chief Justice of the Court Martial Appeal Court of Canada; 1994–2004	Succeeded by Edmond P. Blanchard
