= Allan Lutfy =

Canadian former judge (born 1943)

Chief Justice of the Federal Court of Canada
- In office 2 July 2003 – 30 September 2011

Personal details
- Born: 21 November 1943 (age 82) Montreal, Quebec, Canada
- Education: Loyola College; McGill University

Allan Lutfy, KC (born 21 November 1943) is a Canadian former judge of the Federal Court of Canada, having served as its Chief Justice prior to retiring from his post on 30 September 2011.

Lutfy was born as one of three sons to Violet (née Barakett) and Fred Lutfy. He studied at Loyola College and McGill University, where he was selected as the Articles Editor for the McGill Law Journal, before graduating in 1967. He was called to the Quebec Bar in 1968. Between 1973 to 1979, Lutfy was an advisor to Pierre Trudeau. He was appointed Queen's Counsel in 1983. He was appointed as a judge of the Federal Court in 1996, made Associate Chief Justice in 1999, and was appointed Chief Justice in 2003 after the passing of the Courts Administration Service Act.

Lutfy married his wife, Brigitte Lord, in December 1979. The couple has three children.
