= Illegal agreement =

Agreement to engage in illegal activity

An illegal agreement, under the common law of contract, is one that the court will not enforce because either (1) the making of the agreement itself is illegal or (2) the agreement becomes illegal because of the way in which it is performed. The classic example of such an agreement is an agreement to commit a crime. For example, entering into a contract for murder is itself illegal because that very act can be prosecuted as the crime of conspiracy to commit a murder. Ewan McKendrick notes that contracts which are "contrary to public policy" are often referred to, for ease, as "illegal" contracts".

The illegality of a contract depends on the law of the jurisdiction governing the contract, and the law of the place of performance: different rules will apply depending on the laws of the relevant jurisdictions.

However, a contract that requires only legal performance on the part of each party, such as the sale of packs of cards to a known gambler, where gambling is illegal, will nonetheless be enforceable. A contract directly linked to the gambling act itself, such as paying off gambling debts (see proximate cause), however, will not meet the legal standards of enforceability. Therefore, an employment contract between a blackjack dealer and a speakeasy manager, is an example of an illegal agreement and the employee has no valid claim to his anticipated wages if gambling is illegal under that jurisdiction.

== Case law ==
In Bovard v. American Horse Enterprises (1988), the California Court of Appeal for the Third District refused to enforce a contract for payment of promissory notes used for the purchase of a company that manufactured drug paraphernalia. Although the items sold were not actually illegal, the court refused to enforce the contract for public policy concerns.

In Canada, one cited case of lack of enforceability based on illegality is Royal Bank of Canada v. Newell (1997 NSCA 196), in which a woman forged her husband's signature on 40 cheques, totalling over $58,000. To protect her from prosecution, her husband signed a letter of intent prepared by the bank in which he agreed to assume "all liability and responsibility" for the forged cheques. However, the agreement was unenforceable, and was struck down by the courts, because of its essential goal, which was to "stifle a criminal prosecution". Because of the contract's illegality, and as a result voided status, the bank was forced to return the payments made by the husband.

Contracts in restraint of trade are a variety of illegal contracts and generally will not be enforced unless they are reasonable in the interests of the contracting parties and the public.

Contracts in restraint of trade if proved to be reasonable can be enforced. When restraint is placed on an ex-employee, the court will consider the geographical limits, what the employee knows and the extent of the duration. Restraint imposed on a vendor of business must be reasonable and is binding if there is a genuine seal of goodwill. Under common law, contracts to fix prices are legal. Sole supplier ("solus") agreements are legal if reasonable. Contracts which contravene public policy are void.

== See also ==
- In pari delicto
- Nemo auditur propriam turpitudinem allegans
- UK case law in ParkingEye Ltd. v Somerfield Stores Ltd. (2012)
