= Court Martial Appeal Court of Canada =

- Coat of Arms of the Court Martial Appeal Court
- Established: 1959
- Jurisdiction: Canada
- Location: Thomas D'Arcy McGee Building, Ottawa, Ontario
- Composition method: Military Court
- Authorized by: Constitution Act, 1867, s. 101; National Defence Act
- Appeals to: Supreme Court of Canada
- Appeals from: Courts martial of Canada
- Number of positions: 58
- Website: CMAC Homepage

Chief Justice
- Currently: Mary J.L. Gleason
- Since: 10 January 2025

The Court Martial Appeal Court of Canada (CMAC) (French: Cour d'appel de la cour martiale du Canada) hears appeals from Courts-martial of Canada ("courts martial").

In Canada, courts martial are presided over by independent military judges from the office of the Chief Military Judge. They have the jurisdiction to try military personnel, and those civilian personnel that accompany military personnel abroad, for crimes that contravene the Code of Service Discipline and the National Defence Act; which incorporates many of the offences under the Criminal Code and related statutes.

The CMAC was established in 1959 by Parliament under the National Defence Act, to replace the Court Martial Appeal Board. Due to the court's small caseload, justices of the CMAC are cross-appointed from justices of provincial superior courts and the Federal Court and Federal Court of Appeal. Appeals from the CMAC lie with the Supreme Court of Canada. Appeals require leave from the Supreme Court, unless a justice of the CMAC dissents on a question of law, in which case there is an appeal as of right to the Supreme Court.
