= Federal Court of Canada =

Former Canadian federal court (1971–2003)

Federal Court of Canada Cour fédérale du Canada
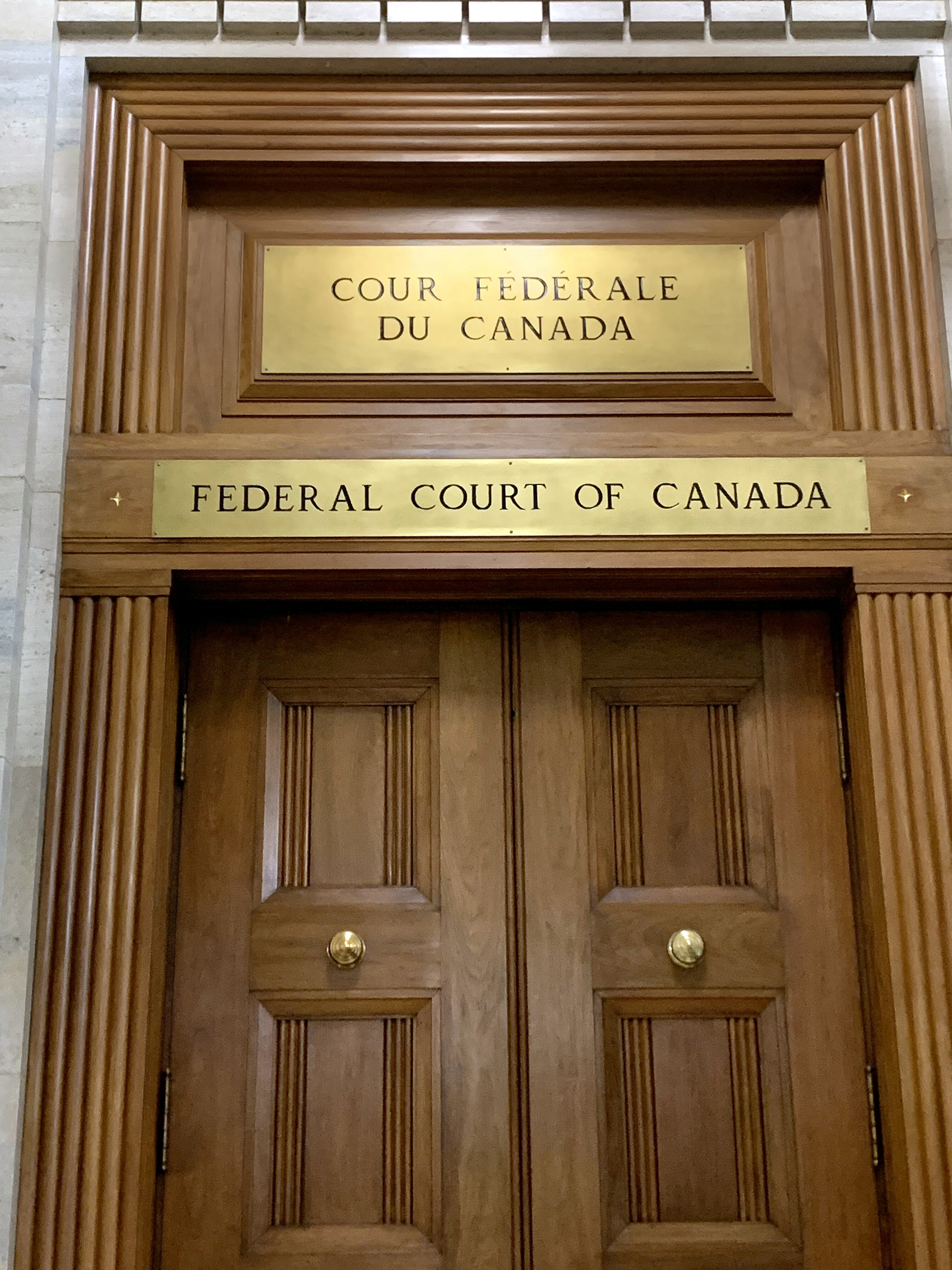
- Entrance to Federal Courtroom in the Supreme Court of Canada building
- Established: June 1, 1971; 54 years ago
- Dissolved: July 2, 2003; 22 years ago
- Jurisdiction: Canada
- Location: Sat across Canada
- Composition method: Appointed by Governor General on advice of federal Cabinet
- Authorized by: Constitution Act, 1867; Federal Courts Act
- Appeals to: 1. Appeal from Trial Division to Appellate Division; 2. Appeal from Appellate Division to Supreme Court of Canada
- Appeals from: 1. Trial Division heard applications for judicial review of federal boards, agencies; 2. Appellate Division heard appeals from Trial Division and Tax Court of Canada; 3. Appellate Division heard applications for judicial review from decisions of major federal agencies
- Judge term length: Mandatory retirement at age 75
- Number of positions: Chief Justice of the Federal Court; Associate Chief Justice of the Federal Court; Judges
- Language: English and French
- Type of tribunal: Court of law, equity, admiralty and judicial review
- Website: Official web site as of October 2002

The Federal Court of Canada, which succeeded the Exchequer Court of Canada in 1971, was a national court of Canada that had limited jurisdiction to hear certain types of disputes arising under the federal government's legislative jurisdiction. Originally composed of two divisions, the Appellate Division and the Trial Division, in 2003 the court was split into two separate courts, the Federal Court and the Federal Court of Appeal.

The court used facilities at the Supreme Court of Canada Building as well as Thomas D'Arcy McGee Building and registry office at 90 Elgin Street.

== History ==
=== Constitutional jurisdiction ===
Prior to Confederation, there was no court that had jurisdiction across British North America. The Fathers of Confederation agreed that the provinces would keep their existing court systems, but the new federal government would have the power to create a federal court with jurisdiction across the country. This power was set out in s. 101 of the British North America Act, 1867 (now the Constitution Act, 1867):

101 The Parliament of Canada may, notwithstanding anything in this Act, from Time to Time provide for the Constitution, Maintenance, and Organization of a General Court of Appeal for Canada, and for the Establishment of any additional Courts for the better Administration of the Laws of Canada.

=== Creation of the Exchequer Court ===
It took eight years to establish the planned federal court. Prime Minister John A. Macdonald made several attempts between 1869 and 1873 to create a national court under the powers granted to Parliament under s. 101 of the Constitution Act, 1867. These early attempts did not pass Parliament, due to concerns over jurisdiction, particularly because the early proposals would have established a federal Supreme Court exercising both original (trial) jurisdiction and concurrent appellate jurisdiction potentially in conflict with existing courts administered by the provinces.

In 1875, the Liberal government of Prime Minister Alexander Mackenzie passed The Supreme and Exchequer Court Act which established both the Supreme Court of Canada and the Exchequer Court. The Exchequer Court was primarily a court for revenue claims involving the federal government, modelled on the Court of Exchequer in England, both in name and in jurisdiction.

The Exchequer Court did not originally have its own separate judges. Initially, the judges of the Supreme Court were also the judges of the Exchequer Court. It was not until 1887 that the Exchequer Court received its own judge. As time passed, the number of judges was increased and the jurisdiction of the Exchequer Court was expanded. Eventually, in 1971 the federal Parliament created the Federal Court, replacing the Exchequer Court.

=== Federal Court of Canada ===
In 1971, the Exchequer Court was continued as a new court, the Federal Court of Canada. The new court consisted of two divisions: the "Federal Court – Trial Division" and the "Federal Court – Appeal Division". The new court inherited the jurisdiction of the Exchequer Court, and gained jurisdiction over judicial review of the decisions of federal boards, commissions and agencies.

=== Federal Court of Canada split into two courts ===
On July 2, 2003, the court was split into two separate courts, with the "Trial Division" continued as the Federal Court and the "Appeal Division" continued as the Federal Court of Appeal. That is the current structure for the federal courts.

== Organization ==
The court consisted of a first-level trial court, known as the Federal Court of Canada – Trial Division, and an appellate Court, known as the Federal Court of Canada – Appeal Division (also referred to as the Federal Court of Appeal).

The Trial Division had jurisdiction to hear judicial review of decisions of federal boards and tribunals, including most immigration matters, as well as jurisdiction in admiralty, intellectual property, and disputes involving the federal government.

The Appeal Division had jurisdiction to hear appeals of decisions of the Trial Division, as well as to determine applications for judicial review of decisions made by specific boards and tribunals, set out in section 28 of the Federal Court Act. Decisions of the Appeal Division could be appealed to the Supreme Court of Canada, but only if leave (permission) was granted by either court.

The Federal Court Act provided that juries were not to be used, so all matters in the Trial Division were decided by a single judge. Some pre-trial steps such as motions were decided by prothonotaries, a role similar to a master in other courts. The judges and prothonotaries were appointed by the governor in council, namely the governor general of Canada acting on the advice of the federal Cabinet.

== Jurisdiction ==
Unlike the general courts set up by each province, matters could not be brought before the Federal Court of Canada unless a law explicitly allowed the proceeding. The docket of the court primarily consisted of judicial reviews of immigration, intellectual property, and federal employment disputes. The court could also deal with incidental aspects of a dispute that fell outside its jurisdiction if the primary dispute was within its jurisdiction.

The court was a national court so trials and hearings occurred throughout Canada. Any orders rendered by the court were enforceable in all the provinces and territories. This contrasts with the provincial superior courts which are organized by each province and require additional steps to enforce decisions in other provinces.

The Federal Court of Canada gained the jurisdiction to hear judicial reviews from federal agencies and tribunals. With respect to maritime jurisdiction, the Trial Division was declared to have:

concurrent original jurisdiction ... in all cases in which a claim for relief is made or a remedy is sought under or by virtue of Canadian maritime law or any other law of Canada relating to any matter coming within the class of subject of navigation and shipping except to the extent that jurisdiction has been otherwise specially assigned.

Until 1976, there was substantial judicial support for the view that Parliament could give a federal court jurisdiction over any matter (even a matter not regulated by federal statute law), on the basis that "the Laws of Canada" meant not only federal statutes, but provincial ones as well. However, in Quebec North Shore Paper Co. v. Canadian Pacific, the Supreme Court of Canada rejected this position, as:

- provincial law is not pro tanto federal law, nor can it be transposed into federal law for the purposes of giving jurisdiction to the Federal Court.
- judicial jurisdiction of the Federal Court is not co-extensive with legislative jurisdiction of Parliament, as "the Laws of Canada" carries the requirement that there be applicable and existing federal law

== Judges ==
=== Prior judges ===
The judges of this court are listed below.

= former judge of the Exchequer Court of Canada
= stepped down from original appointment
† = died in office

Judges of the Federal Court of Canada, June 1, 1971 – July 2, 2003
Name	Trial Division	Appeal Division	Associate Chief Justice	Chief Justice	Left office	Transferred to	
Name	Trial Division	Appeal Division	Associate Chief Justice	Chief Justice	Left office	Federal Court	Federal Court of Appeal
Wilbur R. Jackett				June 1, 1971	October 1, 1979		
Camilien Noël			June 1, 1971		July 4, 1975		
Jacques Dumoulin		June 1, 1971			December 1, 1972		
Arthur L. Thurlow		June 1, 1971	December 4, 1975	January 4, 1980	May 5, 1988		
Alexander Cattanach	June 1, 1971				July 26, 1984		
Hugh F. Gibson	June 1, 1971				December 14, 1981		
Allison Walsh	June 1, 1971				June 30, 1986		
Roderick Kerr	June 1, 1971				September 1, 1975		
Louis Pratte	June 10, 1971	January 25, 1973			January 1, 1999		
Darrel V. Heald	June 30, 1971	December 4, 1975			August 27, 1994		
Frank U. Collier	September 15, 1971				December 31, 1992		
John J. Urie		April 19, 1973			December 15, 1990		
Raymond G. Décary	September 13, 1973				January 31, 1984		
Patrick M. Mahoney	September 13, 1973	July 18, 1983			October 31, 1994		
George A. Addy	September 17, 1973				September 28, 1990		
William F. Ryan		April 11, 1974			August 1, 1986		
Jean-Eudes Dubé	April 9, 1975				November 6, 2001		
Gerald Le Dain		September 1, 1975			May 28, 1984		
Louis Marceau	December 23, 1975	July 18, 1983			May 1, 2000		
James Alexander Jerome			February 18, 1980		March 4, 1998		
Paul U.C. Rouleau	August 5, 1982					✓	
James K. Hugessen		July 18, 1983				✓	
Arthur J. Stone		July 18, 1983					✓
John McNair	July 18, 1983				August 31, 1990		
Francis C. Muldoon	July 18, 1983				September 4, 2001		
Barry L. Strayer	July 18, 1983	August 30, 1994					✓
Barbara Reed	November 17, 1983				July 22, 2000		
Mark R. MacGuigan		June 29, 1984			†January 12, 1998		
Pierre Denault	June 29, 1984				November 1, 2001		
Louis-Marcel Joyal	June 29, 1984				December 31, 1998		
Bud Cullen	July 26, 1984				August 31, 2000		
Bertrand Lacombe		October 29, 1985			December 7, 1989		
Leonard Martin	October 29, 1985				October 24, 1991		
Max M. Teitelbaum	October 29, 1985					✓	
Alice Desjardins		June 29, 1987					✓
Frank Iacobucci				September 2, 1988	January 6, 1991		
W. Andrew MacKay	September 2, 1988					✓	
Robert Décary		March 14, 1990			July 1, 2001		
Allen M. Linden		July 5, 1990			October 7, 2009		
Julius A. Isaac		September 1, 1999		December 24, 1991			✓
Gilles Létourneau		May 13, 1992					✓
Joseph Robertson		May 13, 1992			July 27, 2000		
Donna McGillis	May 13, 1992				May 15, 2003		
Marc Noël	June 24, 1992	June 23, 1998					✓
Marshall E. Rothstein	June 24, 1992	January 22, 1999					✓
Francis J. McDonald		April 1, 1993			September 6, 2001		
Frederick E. Gibson	April 1, 1993					✓	
William P. McKeown	April 1, 1993				September 1, 2002		
Marc Nadon	June 10, 1993	December 14, 2001					✓
Howard Wetston	June 16, 1993				January 11, 1999		
John D. Richard			June 23, 1998	November 4, 1999			✓
J. Edgar Sexton		June 23, 1998					✓
Pierre Blais	June 23, 1998					✓	
John Maxwell Evans	June 26, 1998	December 30, 1999					✓
Karen Sharlow	January 21, 1999	November 4, 1999					✓
J.D. Denis Pelletier	February 16, 1999	December 14, 2001					✓
Brian D. Malone		November 4, 1999					✓
Allan Lutfy			December 8, 1999			✓	
Eleanor Dawson	December 8, 1999					✓	
Carolyn Layden-Stevenson	January 25, 2002					✓	
Johanne Gauthier	December 11, 2002					✓	

== See also ==
- Court system of Canada
- Law of Canada
