= Raphael Sassower =

Israeli-American philosopher

Raphael Sassower (born September 26, 1955) is an Israeli-American philosopher and professor of philosophy at the University of Colorado Colorado Springs (UCCS). His academic work spans economics, medical theory and methodology, science and technology, postmodernism, education, aesthetics, and Popperian philosophy.

He is also recognized for his contributions to postmodern philosophy and technoscience.

== Education and career ==
Sassower was born and raised in Israel. He served as an officer in the Israeli Army before immigrating to the United States. He received his B.A. in economics and philosophy from Lake Forest College in 1980, and his Ph.D. in philosophy from Boston University in 1985. While at Boston University, he studied under Joseph Agassi.

Sassower has spent most of his academic career at the University of Colorado Colorado Springs, where he established and directed the Center for Arts and Humanities and the Center for Women's Studies. He is the director of the Center for Legal Studies and the Minor in Pre-Law, and has also served as chair of the Department of Philosophy. He received the President's Teaching Scholar Award in 2014 and has been described by colleagues as a public intellectual.

His doctoral dissertation was titled "What Gives Economics Scientific Status? Methodological Transformation in Political Economy and Its Pragmatic Consequences." His research interests include political economy, and he contributes frequently to the Colorado Springs Business Journal.

In addition to his academic work, Sassower has been active as an entrepreneur, starting several businesses that contributed to the revitalization of downtown Colorado Springs.

== Research contributions ==
=== Postmodern technoscience ===
Postmodernism is not strictly understood as a chronological development following modernism. Instead, it is regarded as having a broader scope than modernism. It is often described as an interdisciplinary worldview that acknowledges inherent contradictions and allows for a plurality of "truths."

Technoscience is a term used to describe the close relationship between the development of science and technology. Within this framework, scientists are seen as having an ethical obligation to be accountable for the technological consequences of their work. When science and technology are understood as interconnected—as well as central to economic growth—the social and ethical implications of research become more prominent.

In contrast, the traditional modernist view treats science as morally neutral and technology as morally suspect only in its applications. Postmodern conceptions of technoscience, however, emphasize the reciprocal relationship between science and technology, with each informing the other.

== Works ==
=== Books ===
- Philosophy of Economics: A Critique of Demarcation. Lanham, MD: University Press of America, 1985. (Revised PhD dissertation: "What Gives Economics Scientific Status? Methodological Transformation in Political Economy and Its Pragmatic Consequences.")
- Narrative Experiments: The Discursive Authority of Science and Technology (with Gayle L. Ormiston). Minneapolis: University of Minnesota Press, 1989.
- Prescriptions: The Dissemination of Medical Authority (edited with Gayle L. Ormiston). Westport, CT: Greenwood Press, 1990.
- Knowledge without Expertise: On the Status of Scientists. Albany, NY: SUNY Press, 1993. (Selected as one of the Outstanding Books of 1993 by Choice.)
- Cultural Collisions: Postmodern Technoscience. New York: Routledge, 1995.
- Technoscientific Angst: Ethics and Responsibility. Minneapolis: University of Minnesota Press, 1997.
- The Golden Avant-Garde: Idolatry, Commercialism, and Art (with Louis Cicotello). Charlottesville: University of Virginia Press, 2000.
- A Sanctuary of Their Own: Intellectual Refugees in the Academy. Lanham, Boulder, New York, and Oxford: Rowman & Littlefield, 2000.
- Confronting Disaster: An Existential Approach to Technoscience. Lanham, Boulder, New York, and Oxford: Rowman & Littlefield, 2004.
- Political Blind Spots: Reading the Ideology of Images (with Louis Cicotello). Lanham, Boulder, New York, and Oxford: Rowman & Littlefield, 2006.
- Popper's Legacy: Rethinking Politics, Economics, and Science. London: Acumen Publishers; Montreal: McGill–Queen's University Press, 2006.
- Ethical Choices in Contemporary Medicine (with Mary Ann Cutter). London: Acumen Publishers; Montreal: McGill–Queen's University Press, 2007.
- Postcapitalism: Moving Beyond Ideology in Economic Crises. Boulder: Paradigm Publishers, 2009.
- War Images: Fabricating Reality (with Louis Cicotello). Lanham, Boulder, New York, and Oxford: Rowman & Littlefield, 2010.
- Solo: Postmodern Explorations. Lanham, Boulder, New York, and Oxford: Rowman & Littlefield, 2011.
- Digital Exposure: Postmodern Postcapitalism. Hampshire, UK: Palgrave Macmillan, 2013.
- The Price of Public Intellectuals. Hampshire, UK: Palgrave Macmillan, 2014.
- Religion and Sports in American Culture (with Jeff Scholes). London and New York: Routledge, 2014.
- Compromising the Ideals of Science. Hampshire, UK: Palgrave Macmillan, 2015.
- Democratic Problem-Solving: Dialogues in Social Epistemology (with Justin Cruickshank). London: Rowman & Littlefield International, 2016.
- The Quest for Prosperity: Reframing Political Economy. London: Rowman & Littlefield International, 2017.

=== Selected publications ===
- “A Bridge over Turbulent Waters: A Reply to Justin Cruickshank on Comparing Popper and Rorty.” Social Epistemology Review and Reply Collective 3, no. 3 (2014): 57–59.
- “Virtual Reality and Mediated Immersion.” Humanities and Technology Review 31 (Fall 2012): 1–24.
- “East Meets West: Beyond the Reach of the Law.” In The Image of the Outlaw in Literature, Media, and Society, edited by Will Wright and Steven Kaplan, 360–363. Proceedings of the Society for the Interdisciplinary Study of Social Imagery, 2011.
- “Heroism as a Struggle between Reason and Desire.” In The Image of the Hero II, edited by Will Wright and Steven Kaplan, 87–92. Proceedings of the Society for the Interdisciplinary Study of Social Imagery, 2010.
- “Postmodern Aesthetics: Manipulating War Images.” In Tensions and Convergences: Technological and Aesthetical Transformation of Society, edited by Marcus Stippak, 351–361. Bielefeld: Transcript Verlag, 2006.
- “Misplaced Pressure: Between Bondage and Rage at the University.” Science Studies 10, no. 2 (1997): 23–34.
- “Pedagogy as Psychology: A View from Within.” In Critical Rationalism, the Social Sciences and the Humanities: Essays for Joseph Agassi, edited by I. C. Jarvie and N. Laor, vol. 2, 1995.
- “A Conceptual Approach to Child Maltreatment.” With Michael A. Grodin. Pediatrician: International Journal of Child and Adolescent Health 17 (1990): 74–78.
- “Ethical Issues in AIDS Research.” With Michael A. Grodin and Paula Kaminow. Quality Review Bulletin: Journal of Quality Assurance 12 (1986): 347–352. Revised and reprinted in New England Journal of Public Policy 4 (1988): 215–225; reprinted in The AIDS Epidemic: Private Rights and the Public Interest, edited by Padraig O’Malley, Boston: Beacon Press, 1989.
