= Technocriticism =

Branch of critical theory

Technocriticism is a branch of critical theory devoted to the study of technological change.

Technocriticism treats technological transformation as historically specific changes in personal and social practices of research, invention, regulation, distribution, promotion, appropriation, use, and discourse, rather than as an autonomous or socially indifferent accumulation of useful inventions, or as an uncritical narrative of linear "progress", "development" or "innovation".

Technocriticism studies these personal and social practices in their changing practical and cultural significance. It documents and analyzes both their private and public uses, and often devotes special attention to the relations among these different uses and dimensions. Recurring themes in technocritical discourse include the deconstruction of essentialist concepts such as "health", "human", "nature" or "norm".

Technocritical theory can be either "descriptive" or "prescriptive" in tone. Descriptive forms of technocriticism include some scholarship in the history of technology, science and technology studies, cyberculture studies and philosophy of technology. More prescriptive forms of technocriticism can be found in the various branches of technoethics, for example, media criticism, infoethics, bioethics, neuroethics, roboethics, nanoethics, existential risk assessment and some versions of environmental ethics and environmental design theory.

Figures engaged in technocritical scholarship and theory include Donna Haraway and Bruno Latour (who work in the closely related field of science studies), N. Katherine Hayles (who works in the field of Literature and Science), Phil Agree and Mark Poster (who works in intellectual history), Marshall McLuhan and Friedrich Kittler (who work in the closely related field of media studies), Susan Squier and Richard Doyle (who work in the closely related field of medical sociology), and Hannah Arendt, Walter Benjamin, Martin Heidegger, and Michel Foucault (who sometimes wrote about the philosophy of technology). Technocriticism can be juxtaposed with a number of other innovative interdisciplinary areas of scholarship which have surfaced in recent years such as technoscience and technoethics.
