= Organizational technoethics =

Organizational technoethics (OT) is a branch stemming from technoethics. Advances in technology and their ability to transmit vast amounts of information in a short amount of time have changed the way information is being shared amongst co-workers and managers throughout organizations across the globe. Starting in the 1980s with information and communications technologies (ICTs), organizations have seen an increase in the amount of technology that they rely on to communicate within and outside of the workplace. However, these implementations of technology in the workplace create various ethical concerns and in turn a need for further analysis of technology in organizations. As a result of this growing trend, a subsection of technoethics known as organizational technoethics has emerged to address these issues.

== Changes to organizational structure ==
Organizational technoethics "focuses on how technological advances are redefining organizations and how they operate within an evolving knowledge economy". This new focus on knowledge and information within organizations has changed the way they function on a daily basis and has made it apparent that "as knowledge-intensive work gradually becomes the cornerstone of this economy, understanding its control practices is consequential to organizational effectiveness, worker satisfaction and ethical conditions of organizational governance". With this "knowledge intensive work" at the forefront of most organizations, the efficient transmission of this knowledge and information now becomes a major priority to be carried out in the workplace. The introduction of the Internet in the workplace allowed employees to transmit information electronically not only to others in their own office but those in other countries as well. Technology began to facilitate the rapid exchange of information for these organizations and thus contributed to a structural change in how they operate. These changes prompted researchers to delve deeper into the issues surrounding organizational technoethics in how technology was shaping the workplace, whether positively or negatively, and the ethical issues that may arise.

The use of ICTs within organizations have given way to a new kind of office setting where physically being in the office is not mandatory to get the job done. This recent trend coined by many as the virtual workplace involves several workplaces that are connected through technology and are not hindered by physical restraints. Remote work, hot desking, and virtual teams are the three major types of virtual workplaces that have been made possible through the use of technology and have changed the way many organizations communicate and transmit information.

== New ethical challenges ==
The increasing use of ICTs in the workplace has presented organizations with new ethical challenges. It has been argued that ICT use in organizational settings can contribute to counterproductive behaviour and deviancy as the line between personal and professional lives becomes blurred. Usually this behaviour consists of non-sanctioned use of ICTs during work hours, such as updating personal blogs, playing games, doing personal banking online, and using email for non-work related activities.

In response to these popular misuses of technology in the workplace, some organizations have implemented workplace surveillance technologies and content-control software to monitor and restrict employees' activities online. ICT use in medical organizations has also given rise to new ethical dilemmas, such as the use of electronic medical records. These have created privacy concerns relating to potential breaches of doctor-patient confidentiality as well as concerns with information storage.

=== Organizational restrictions on social networking ===
One area of technoethics that is growing increasingly popular is organizational ethics and technology. The introduction of technology into organizations has fueled many different questions. Among these many questions is whether or not the technology being used is ethical. Many different case studies have been conducted in organizations around the world. In these case studies, new technology that has been introduced to an organization is examined. During the examination, one ethical question that seems to be a main focus for researchers is whether or not the new technology maintains users' privacy.

The advent of technology has also opened up new avenues and opportunities for individuals to misbehave; for example, cyberloafing, the act of employees using their companies' Internet access for personal purposes during work hours. While access to the internet may not result in an increase in production deviance with more people engaging in loafing per se, the temptation to do so is certainly higher since the Internet makes it so much easier and convenient to loaf in this manner. It is suggested by Lim when organizations are distributively, procedurally and interactionally unjust in their treatment of their employees (i.e., organizations have not given expected rewards or fair treatment in exchange for fair work), these employees are more likely to invoke the neutralization technique to legitimize their subsequent engagement in the act of cyberloafing. (Lim 2002) One technology that has grown in popularity in recent years is social networking sites, as many people use sites such as Facebook for personal and professional reasons. Organizations all over the world, including those in the Canadian province of Ontario, have begun to block access to Facebook and have led to criticism of Facebook. For example, in May 2007, Ontario government employees, Federal public servants, MPPs and cabinet ministers were blocked from access to Facebook on government computers. Employees trying to access Facebook received a warning message that read "The Internet website that you have requested has been deemed unacceptable for use for government business purposes". The use of social networking sites led to a fear that government offices would become more vulnerable to computer viruses and hackers. However, with the government denying the use of these websites in their offices, many ethical questions arise about whether or not denying employees access to something that is readily available to everyone else is an infringement on the employees' rights and freedoms as Canadian citizens.

=== Technoethical challenges in medical organizations ===
Another area of organizational technoethics that has been becoming increasingly popular is in the field of medicine. Medical ethics are based on values and judgments in a practical clinical placement where six values are portrayed the most: autonomy, beneficence, non-maleficence, justice, dignity, truthfulness and honesty. Many of the issues in medical ethics are due to a lack of communication between the patients, family members, and health care team. An asset to medical ethics that has brought attention to its advantages and disadvantages are electronic medical records. This is a new way to update, organize and store patients' medical records in a database that can be accessible to other doctors by using the network.

An issue in organizational technoethics in the medical field that is an increasing matter is the privacy issue with electronic medical records. To start, some advantages of EMRs are that they can minimize errors, keep records safe in the database, it is cost efficient, translates into a better treatment for the patients and can even give some control over health records to the patients. On the other hand, EMRs have brought upon some disadvantages mainly around privacy issues. First, it threatens a patient's privacy. Having a patient's medical history recorded in the database loses the confidentiality between the doctor and patient since anyone who has access to the system is able to retrieve these files.

Moreover, some do not feel their medical records are safe in the database since others are able to get into personal files and potentially change medical records or misuse the information. A group of researchers conducted a study on the privacy issues raised by the use of EMRs. They concluded that all electronic systems around us have this one-to-many exchange such as the internet and email just like the EMR system. However, more clarity needs to be provided around patient consent and patient restrictions as well as confidentiality issues. With the issue of privacy at hand, many ethical questions have surfaced on whether this electronic system is safe or a hazard to patients due to the easy access and misuse of a patient's information.

=== Technoethics and surveillance ===
Organizational surveillance is becoming a reoccurring issue in the modern day workforce. Today's organizations are facing the ethical dilemma of privacy rights and meeting the societal demands of efficient productivity performances from employees. Organizations have restrictions on employees Web pages and have also implemented surveillance over workers email, Web browsing, and even video surveillance at the workplace. Surveillance has become a technoethical challenge because the rapid development of surveillance technologies. Surveillance is a prominent technoethical challenge because it threatens democracy, privacy, power, as well as brings various types of rights together. Surveillance is a technoethical challenge because it encompasses many ethical dilemmas made by new technology. Surveillance is a technoethical challenges because it threatens personal liberties. Surveillance is said to corrode interpersonal trust, which is essential for democratic governance. Citizens with access to new technologies are becoming more aware of the pervasiveness of these technologies. Surveillances has evolved from people called informers to technology. Citizens are now seen as consumers, and their preferences are monitored in order to feed citizens their preferences rather than serve them with broad perspective. This poses the question: Is it ethical to implement informational narrowcasting (only feeding citizens their preferences)? Surveillance also falls under many other categories and raises other ethical dilemmas. Another ethical dilemma would be: Should citizens be involved in the design process of technological policy on surveillance?

Surveillance can be ethical if states use it to protect national security and do not monitor citizens in the privacy of their bedroom and public washrooms. In 1998 " New surveillance" introduced by technological advances added to the degree of complexity and mobility, that society had not seen before. Surveillance has captured many areas of ethics and technology which translates into Technoethics. Surveillance has looked at power relationships in society, trust and autonomy, privacy, causes, authority as well as necessity, means, distance and social sorting. Technoethics refers to the systems approach taken to look at all of these issues surrounding dilemmas such as surveillance.

The branch of utilitarian ethical theories are "based on the assumption of the greatest happiness to the greatest number of people". Under this perspective of ethical theories, organizational surveillance for the workers does not bring happiness; "Workplace surveillance has consequences for employees, affecting employee well-being, work culture, productivity, creativity and motivation". According to this report, the results show that surveillance produces the exact opposite results in which surveillance was implemented for, to increase workplace productivity. With organizational surveillance creating a workplace environment where employees feel unmotivated and as a result productivity will decrease. If the productivity of employees lack than the organization may not experience the rate of growth and success as wanted by management and ultimately, will lead to an overall unhappiness for both parties, employees and the organization.

Another branch of ethical theories which can be applied is duty ethics. Duty ethics is "concerned with the obligations one has to others in society". Under this perspective, organizations have the obligation to provide services and goods to society. In order to produce services and goods for society, organizations must be efficient in productivity. As result of this need, organizations have implemented surveillance on employees in order to meet this obligation. Also, employees have the obligation to meet their own performance goals at the workplace, which align with the overall goals of the organization.

=== Organizational restrictions on Internet publishing ===
The Internet has become a popular medium of expression and accessing information and data. As the Internet community expands, there has been great debate on whether or not the internet should be censored, and if so, by whom. In Canada, there are many public and private organisations with the authority to censor, including many self-censoring associations and service providers. Canadian internet censorship is not specifically regulated; however local laws do apply to websites hosted in Canada as well as to residents who host sites on servers in other jurisdictions. Canada has seen many cases regarding websites including defamatory material and material promoting hatred or contempt.

Important Canadian cases that raise the question of control of the flow of content on the Internet include:

- The Karla Homolka case. In 1993, the judge presiding over the trial of Karla Homolka placed a Canadian publication ban on the proceedings. Through the use of the internet, internationally published materials were then made available in Canada, undermining the court order. McGill University, followed by a number of other universities, immediately took responsibility of the university law under law to control the reception of content within its own constituency because of its liability as an Internet Service Provider (ISP) to restrict Bernardo-Holmolka material to its internet users, and later extended these restrictions by removing access to various Usenet newsgroups which the administrators felt might be violating the Canadian laws regarding obscenity and hate literature.
- The Ernst Zündel case. Ernst Christof Friedrich Zundel, a German Holocaust denier living in Ontario, Canada and author of various works such as Did Six Million Really Die? and The Hitler We Loved and Why was charged by the Canadian Human Rights Commission for violation of Section 13 of the Canadian Human Rights Act, for promoting "hatred or contempt" against Jews through the American-based and operated Zundelsite.org Internet website. He was deported to Germany in 2005, after being declared a threat to Canada's national security in 2003.

Many cases were ruled through Section 13(1) of the Canadian Human Rights Act, such as the Marc Lemire case, which featured a "white nationalist" website hosted out of Hamilton, Ontario, Canada. However, the Canadian Human Rights Tribunal (CHRT) found that Section 13 was unconstitutional and refused to apply the provisions against the individual for reasons of freedom of speech. All other Section 13 cases in Canada have been postponed pending on final decision of the applicability of Section 13.

== Future ==
Organizational ethics and technology is a hot-bed for discussion. Whether it is about the maintenance of worker's privacy or the censoring of social network sites, organizations are striving to find a way to balance both their worker's agency and their productivity. It seems the fluid nature of the Internet is forcing the hand of companies to allow their workers some benefits to access the sites they normally would outside of the office, while at the same time maintaining a strict policy to not abuse any privileges meted out. The medical field has brought on a new technology that hopes to effectively and systematically ease the process of updating, storing, and organizing patient's records in a manner that suits both the patients and the doctors that treat them. With the advent of electronic medical records (EMR), the field of medical ethics has also seen an influx in ethical discourse. While the technology is different from social media per se, the efforts to protect the worker's (or patient's) privacy is similar and equally paramount to their survival. Patients will look to online databases to ensure that their information is both correct and secure, while trying to maintain the pseudo-ageless "doctor-patient confidentiality", even with full knowledge that their information is accessible worldwide with the click of a button. Looking ahead to how EMR advances, and whether or not organizations will always feel the need to block social network sites all depends on how they continue to be used as people become more complacent with the technology. There will always be instances of ethical debates concerning technology within an organizational context, as the only things that seem to change are the technologies surrounding them.

== See also ==
- Applied ethics
- Computer ethics
- Cyberethics
- Digital rights
- Information ethics
- Organizational communication
- Technoethics
