= Robotic governance =

Robotic governance provides a regulatory framework to deal with autonomous and intelligent machines. This includes research and development activities as well as handling of these machines. The idea is related to the concepts of corporate governance, technology governance and IT-governance, which provide a framework for the management of organizations or the focus of global IT infrastructure.

Robotic governance describes the impact of robotics, automation technology and artificial intelligence on society from a holistic, global perspective, considers implications and provides recommendations for actions in a Robot Manifesto. This is realized by the Robotic Governance Foundation, an international non-profit organization.

The robotic governance approach is based on the German research on discourse ethics. Therefore, the discussion should involve all stakeholders, including scientists, society, religion, politics, industry as well as labor unions in order to reach a consensus on how to shape the future of robotics and artificial intelligence. The compiled framework, the so-called Robot Manifesto, will provide voluntary guidelines for a self-regulation in the fields of research, development as well as use and sale of autonomous and intelligent systems.

The concept does not only appeal to the responsibility of researchers and robot manufacturers, but like with child labor and sustainability, also means a raising of opportunity costs. The greater public awareness and pressure will become concerning this topic, the harder it will get for companies to conceal or justify violations. Therefore, from a certain point it will be cheaper for organizations to invest in sustainable technologies and accepted.

== History of the concept ==
The idea to set ethical standards for intelligent machines is not a new one and undoubtedly has its roots in science fiction literature. Even older is the discussion about ethics of intelligent, man-made creatures in general. Some of the earliest recorded examples can be found in Ovid's Metamorphoses, in Pygmalion, in the Jewish golem mysticism (12th century) as well as in the idea of Homunkulus (Latin: little man) arisen from the alchemy of the Late Middle Ages.

The fundamental and philosophical question of these literary works is what will happen, if humans presume to create autonomous, conscious or even godlike creatures, machines, robots or androids. While most of the older works broach the issue of the act of creation, if it is morally appropriate and which dangers could arise, Isaac Asimov was the first to realize the necessity to restrict and regulate the freedom of action of machines. He wrote the first Three Laws of Robotics.

At least since the use of drones equipped with air-to-ground missiles in 1995 that can be used against ground targets, like e.g., the General Atomics MQ-1, and the resulting collateral damage, the discussion on the international regulation of remote controlled, programmable and autonomous machines attracted public attention. Nowadays, this discussion covers the entire range of programmable, intelligent and/or autonomous machines, drones as well as automation technology combined with Big Data and artificial intelligence. Lately, well-known visionaries like Stephen Hawking, Elon Musk and Bill Gates brought the topic to the focus of public attention and awareness. Due to the increasing availability of small and cheap systems for public service as well as commercial and private use, the regulation of robotics in all social dimensions gained a new significance.

== Scientific recognition ==
Robotic governance was first mentioned in the scientific community within a dissertation project at the Technical University of Munich, supervised by Professor Dr. emeritus Klaus Mainzer. The topic has been the subject of several scientific workshops, symposia and conferences ever since, including the Sensor Technologies & the Human Experience 2015, the Robotic Governance Panel at the We Robots 2015 Conference, a keynote at the 10th IEEE International Conference on Self-Adaptive and Self-Organizing Systems (SASO), a full day workshop on Autonomous Technologies and their Societal Impact as part of the 2016 IEEE International Conference on Prognostics and Health Management (PHM’16), a keynote at the 2016 IEEE International Conference on Cloud and Autonomic Computing (ICCAC), the FAS*W 2016: IEEE 1st International Workshops on Foundations and Applications of Self* Systems, the 2016 IEEE International Conference on Emerging Technologies and Innovative Business Practices for the Transformation of Societies (IEEE EmergiTech 2016) and the IEEE Global Humanitarian Technology Conference (GHTC 2016).

Since 2015 IEEE even holds an own forum on robotic governance at the IEEE/RSJ International Conference on Intelligent Robots and Systems (IEEE IROS): the first and second "Annual IEEE IROS Futurist Forum", which brought together worldwide renowned experts from a wide range of specialities to discuss the future of robotics and the need for regulation in 2015 and 2016. In 2016 Robotic governance has also been the topic of a plenary keynote presentation on the IEEE/RSJ International Conference on Intelligent Robots and Systems (IROS 2016) in Daejeon, South Korea.

Several video statements and interviews on robotic governance, responsible use of robotics, automation technology and artificial intelligence as well as self-regulation in a world of Robotic Natives, with internationally recognized experts from research, economy and politics are published on the website of the Robotic Governance Foundation. Max Levchin, co-founder and former CTO of PayPal emphasized the need for robotic governance in the course of his Q&A session on the South by Southwest Festival (SXSW) 2016 in Austin and referred to the comments of his friend and colleague Elon Musk on this subject. Gerd Hirzinger, former head of the Institute of Robotics and Mechatronics of the German Aerospace Center, showed during his keynote speech at the IROS Futurist Forum 2015 the possibility of machines being so intelligent that it would be inevitable, one day, to prevent certain behavior. At the same event, Oussama Khatib, American roboticist and director of the Stanford robotics lab, advocated to emphasize the user acceptance when producing intelligent and autonomous machines. Bernd Liepert, president of the euRobotics aisbl – the most important robotics community in Europe – recommended to establish robotic governance worldwide and underlined his wish for Europe taking the lead in this discussion, during his plenary keynote at the IEEE IROS 2015 in Hamburg. Hiroshi Ishiguro, inventor of the Geminoid and head of the Intelligent Robotics Laboratory at the University of Osaka, showed during the RoboBusiness Conference 2016 in Odense that it is impossible to stop technical progress. Therefore, it is necessary to accept the responsibility and to think about regulation. In the course of the same conference, Henrik I. Christensen, author of the U.S. Robotic Roadmap, underlined the importance of ethical and moral values in robotics and the suitability of robotic governance to create a regulatory framework.

== See also ==
- Corporate citizenship
- Corporate social responsibility
- Ethics of artificial intelligence
- Roboethics
- Technology ethics
