= Technoscience =

Study of how technology and science interact

In common usage, technoscience refers to the entire long-standing and global human activity of technology, combined with the relatively recent scientific method that occurred primarily in Europe during the 17th and 18th centuries. Technoscience is the study of how humans interact with technology using the scientific method. Technoscience thus comprises the history of human application of technology and modern scientific methods, ranging from the early development of basic technologies for hunting, agriculture, or husbandry (e.g. the well, the bow, the plow, the harness) and all the way through atomic applications, biotechnology, robotics, and computer sciences. This more common and comprehensive usage of the term technoscience can be found in general textbooks and lectures concerning the history of science.

The relationship with the history of science is important in this subject and also underestimated, for example, by more modern sociologists of science. Instead, it is worth emphasizing the links that exist between books on the history of science and technology and the study of the relationship between science and technology within a framework of social developments. The generational leap between historical periods and scientific discoveries, the construction of machines, and the creation of tools in relation to the technological changes that occurs in very specific situations is important to consider.

An alternate, more narrow usage occurs in some philosophical science and technology studies. In this usage, technoscience refers specifically to the technological and social context of science. Technoscience recognises that scientific knowledge is not only socially coded and historically situated but sustained and made durable by material (non-human) networks. Technoscience states that the fields of science and technology are linked and grow together, and scientific knowledge requires an infrastructure of technology in order to remain stationary or move forward.

The latter, philosophic use of the term technoscience was popularized by French philosopher Gaston Bachelard in 1953. It was popularized in the French-speaking world by Belgian philosopher Gilbert Hottois in the late 1970s and early 1980s, and entered English academic usage in 1987 with Bruno Latour's book Science in Action.

In translating the concept to English, Latour also combined several arguments about technoscience that had circulated separately within science and technology studies (STS) before into a comprehensive framework:

1. the intertwinement of scientific and technological development as e.g. shown by the lab studies;
2. the power of laboratories (and engineering workshops) to change the world as we know and experience it;
3. the seamless webs that connect scientists, engineers and societal actors in actual practice (cf. John Law's concept of heterogeneous engineering);
4. the propensity of technoscientific world to create new nature–culture hybrids, and hence to complicate the borders between nature and culture.

== Conceptual levels of philosophical technoscience ==
The concept of technoscience is considered in three levels: a descriptive-analytic level, a deconstructivist level, and a visionary level.

=== Descriptive-analytic ===
On a descriptive-analytic level, technoscientific studies examine the decisive role of science and technology in how knowledge is being developed. What is the role played by large research labs in which experiments on organisms are undertaken, when it comes to a certain way of looking at the things surrounding us? To what extent do such investigations, experiments and insights shape views of 'nature' and of human bodies? How do these insights link to the concept of living organisms as biofacts? To what extent do such insights inform technological innovation? Can the laboratory be understood as a metaphor for social structures in their entirety?

=== Deconstructive ===
On a deconstructive level, theoretical work is being undertaken on technoscience to address scientific practices critically, e.g. by Bruno Latour (sociology), by Donna Haraway (history of science), and by Karen Barad (theoretical physics). It is pointed out that scientific descriptions may be only allegedly objective; that descriptions are of a performative character, and that there are ways to de-mystify them. Likewise, new forms of representing those involved in research are being sought.

=== Visionary ===
On a visionary level, the concept of technoscience comprises a number of social, literary, artistic and material technologies from western cultures in the third millennium. This is undertaken in order to focus on the interplay of hitherto separated areas and to question traditional boundary-drawing: this concerns the boundaries drawn between scientific disciplines as well as those commonly upheld for instance between research, technology, the arts and politics. One aim is to broaden the term 'technology' (which by the Greek etymology of 'techné' connotes all of the following: arts, handicraft, and skill) so as to negotiate possibilities of participation in the production of knowledge and to reflect on strategic alliances. Technoscience can be juxtaposed with a number of other innovative interdisciplinary areas of scholarship which have surfaced in these recent years such as technoetic, technoethics and technocriticism.

== Facets ==
=== Social ===
As with any subject, technoscience exists within a broader social context that must be considered. Science & Technology Studies researcher Sergio Sismondo argues, "Neither the technical vision nor the social vision will come into being without the other, though with enough Concerted Effort both may be brought into being together". Despite the frequent separation between innovators and the consumers, Sismondo argues that development of technologies, though stimulated by a technoscientific themes, is an inherently social process.

Technoscience is so deeply embedded in people's everyday lives that its developments exist outside a space for critical thought and evaluation, argues Daniel Lee Kleinman (2005). Those who do attempt to question the perception of progress as being only a matter of more technology are often seen as champions of technological stagnation. The exception to this mentality is when a development is seen as threatening to human or environmental well-being. This holds true with the popular opposition of GMO crops, where the questioning of the validity of monopolized farming and patented genetics was simply not enough to rouse awareness.

=== Political ===
Science and technology are tools that continually change social structures and behaviors. Technoscience can be viewed as a form of government or having the power of government because of its impact on society. The impact extends to public health, safety, the environment, and beyond. Innovations create fundamental changes and drastically change the way people live. For example, C-SPAN and social media give American voters a near real-time view of Congress. This has allowed journalists and the people to hold their elected officials accountable in new ways.

=== Environmental ===
Chlorine chemists and their scientific knowledge helped set the agenda for many environmental problems: PCBs in the Hudson River are polychlorinated biphenols; DDT, dieldrin, and aldrin are chlorinated pesticides; CFCs that deplete the ozone layer are chlorofluorocarbons. Industry actually manufactured the chemicals and consumers purchased them. Therefore, one can determine that chemists are not the sole cause for these issues, but they are not blameless.

== See also ==
- Bernard Stiegler
- Feminist technoscience
- Technocriticism
- Technoethics
