= Ethics of nanotechnologies =

Ethics of nanotechnology is the study of the ethical issues emerging from advances in nanotechnology and its impacts.

According to Andrew Chen, ethical concerns about nanotechnologies should include the possibility of their military applications, the dangers posed by self-replicant nanomachines, and their use for surveillance monitoring and tracking. Risks to environment to public health are treated in a report from the Dutch National Institute for Public Health and the Environment as well as is a report of the European Environment Agency. Academic works on ethics of nanotechnology can be found in the journal Nanoethics.

== Guidelines ==
According to the Markkula Center for Applied Ethics possible guidelines for an Ethics of nanotechnology could include:

- Nanomachines should only be specialized, not for general purpose
- Nanomachines should not be self replicating
- Nanomachines should not be made to use an abundant natural compound as fuel
- Nanomachines should be tagged so that they can be tracked

== Concerns ==
Ethical concern about nanotechnology include the opposition to their use to fabricate Lethal autonomous weapon, and the fear that they may self replicate ad infinitum in a so-called gray goo scenario, first imagined by K. Eric Drexler. For the EEA the challenge posed by nano-materials are due to their properties of being novel, biopersistent, readily dispersed, and bioaccumulative; by analogy, thousands cases of mesothelioma were caused by the inhalation of asbestos dust. See nanotoxicology. Nanotechnology belongs to the class of emerging technology known as GRIN: geno-, robo-, info- nano-technologies. Another common acronym is NBIC (Nanotechnology, Biotechnology, Information Technology, and Cognitive Science). These technologies are hoped—or feared, depending on the viewpoint—to be leading to improving human bodies and functionalities (see transhumanism).

On the other hand, the possible application of nanotechnology in human genome sequencing (e.g. nanopores-based sequencing) also raises similar ethical and societal concerns.

== See also ==
- Nanotechnology
- Impact of nanotechnology
- Molecular Manufacturing
- Nanotoxicity
- Nanomaterials
- Nanoparticles
