= Data care =

Method by which data are treated

Data care refers to treating people and their private information fairly and with dignity. Data has progressively become more and more utilized in our society all over the world. When it comes to securely storing a medical patient's data, an employee's data, or a citizen's private data. The concept of data care emerged from the increase of data usage over the years, it is a term used to describe the act of treating people and their data with care and respect. This concept elaborates on how caring for people's data is the responsibility of those who govern data, for example, businesses and policy makers. Along with how to care for it in an ethical manner, while keeping in mind the people that the data belongs to. And discussing the concept of 'slow computing' on how this can be properly utilized to help in creating and maintaining proper data care.

== Defining data care ==
To define data care means treating people and their private information fairly and with dignity in terms of their data. Data care is a term used by the cybersecurity industry, to teach people to be more careful with their data on social media and their mobile devices. Such information could be their banking information, address, and other personal information. In 2019, a United States bill required social media platforms to be more responsible with their users' private data, which will help in ensuring proper data care. This is one example in how implementing proper data care policy will help put pressure on these companies to achieve data justice. Data care aims to allow data navigation while countering data power, and encourages "slow computing" (see below), all of which will help in reducing datafication, and making it more difficult for people's data to become traceable. This will also encourage open source alternatives for data to become more difficult to trace. This is something the cybersecurity industry has been working toward for some time, as a means to help protect people's privacy. Proper data care will help those with weaker data literacy, it will help manage data in political campaigns, and help place pressure on companies to be more ethical in their data use. This can help in producing open source apps, and creating technology that prioritizes the public's private information. Proper data care will help achieve data justice, and lead to data sovereignty.

== Ethics of care ==
Prioritizing proper care and respect towards people's data is of utmost importance, requiring good morals and proper ethical choices to protect people's privacy. Data care involves protecting people's data in medical practices, law, politics, the organization of society, war, and international relations. Hospitals keep their patient's data secure, data such as; routine healthcare data and patient contact. Data is now being kept electronically, replacing paper files. Data obtained from hospitals will often be subject to research, the results cannot be traced to individual participants, and the patients are informed beforehand in case they want to opt out of having their data used in research. Data care is seen as a form of ethics, considering moralities of justice and rights.

== Understanding data ==
The global rise in digital data has led to billions of consumers worldwide, this could allow corporations to utilize this data in an unethical way. Data can be used by authority figures to access, use, or manage people's data, data could also be used to discriminate against low income individuals. Digital data is also being used to track and monitor people. With the rise of smart cities, the increase in digital and biometric registration are becoming the norm around the world. The concept of "data justice" brings awareness to this phenomenon, and encourages data to be used morally and ethically by establishing rules of law. Methods that can be used to enhance data care are to utilize tools such as ad blockers, cookie blockers, proper malware detection and interception, site blocking, encryption tools, and services to opt out of databases controlled by data brokers.

== Slow computing ==
Data care calls for "slow computing," which is an ethical way to morally utilize people's data that intends to protect their privacy in regards to data-driven systems. In other words, slow computing prioritizes protecting people's private information on digital and mobile devices, so they may use these devices without feeling harassed, stressed, or exploited in any way. Then people will be able to enjoy using these devices in conjunction with the slow living movement of enjoyment, patience, sovereignty, authenticity, responsibility, and sustainability. Enforcing the idea of slow computing would involve encouraging corporations to employ market-led regulations on data, and promoting practices such as privacy-by-design. Also encouraging political parties to implement slow computing ideologies into their systems as policy proposals. Governments could also implement their own forms of slow computing for better data care, encouraging fair information principles, privacy-by-design, enacting new legislation that protects people's rights, while also employing other methods of slow computing in their programs and practices. Avoiding data extraction will also help improve data care; industry-led moves, government and policy makers employing new regulations, and data sovereignty agreed upon by communities. A digital society and economy that focuses on a slow computing world would focus on fairness, equity, and justice.

== See also ==
- Applied ethics
- Computers, Freedom and Privacy Conference
- Electronic Frontier Foundation
