= World Press Freedom Canada =

Canadian not-for-profit organization

- Predecessor: Ottawa’s National Press Club
- Formation: 2008
- Type: Nonprofit
- Headquarters: Ottawa
- President: Shawn McCarthy

World Press Freedom Canada (sometimes known as the Canadian Committee for World Press Freedom) is a Canadian not for profit organisation that campaigns for media freedom and journalist safety.

It issues the annual press freedom award.

== Organization ==
World Press Freedom Canada was founded by Spencer Moore and incorporated as a not for profit in 2008, The organization advocates for press freedom and the safety of journalists. The organisation was previously, and sometimes still is, known as the Canadian Committee for World Press Freedom and is a successor to Ottawa’s National Press Club. The Ottawa Press Club faced financial challenges in 2003, filing for bankruptcy protection in July 2003.

In 2021, World Press Freedom Canada's president was Shawn McCarthy.

== History ==
In 2014, the organization organized an event to fundraise for Mohamed Fahmy, an Egyptian-Canadian journalist who was being detained in Egypt and who later won the 2015 Press Freedom prize.

In 2021, the organization was critical of Royal Canadian Mounted Police's activities during the 2020 Canadian pipeline and railway protests.

== Awards ==
World Press Freedom Canada organises and issues the Press Freedom award and the Spencer Moore awards, which were started by the predecessor organisations.

The organization also holds an annual contest among editorial cartoonists, in which cartoonists such as Plantu (2010), Bruce MacKinnon (2014), Signe Wilkinson (2015), and Ali Miraee (2023) and Bruce MacKinnon (2024) have won first prize.

=== Annual award ===
Press Freedom annual award winners
| Year | Winner | Employer (if relevant) | Source |
|---|---|---|---|
| 1999 | Kim Bolan | Vancouver Sun | |
| 2000 | Robert Tripp | Kingston Whig-Standard | |
| 2001 | Corinna Shuller | National Post | |
| 2002 | Haroon Siddiqui | Toronto Star | |
| 2003 | International Freedom of Information Exchange | | |
| 2004 | Andrew McIntosh | National Post | |
| 2005 | Juliet O’Neill | Ottawa Citizen | |
| 2006 | John Hoey and Anne Marie Todkill | Canadian Medical Association Journal | |
| 2007 | Tarek Fatah | | |
| 2008 | Gilles Toupin and Joël-Denis Bellavance | La Presse | |
| 2009 | Daniel Leblanc | Globe and Mail | |
| 2010 | Michelle Lang (posthumously) | Calgary Herald | |
| 2011 | Citizen Lab | | |
| 2012 | Canadian Science Writers’ Association | | |
| 2013 | Stephen Maher and Glen McGregor | Postmedia | |
| 2014 | Katherine Gannon | Associated Press | |
| 2015 | Mohamed Fahmy | | |
| 2016 | Ben Makuch | VICE News | |
| 2017 | Patrick Lagacé Paul Dornstauder and Geoff Leo Paula Simons (Honourable mention) | La Presse Canadian Broadcasting Corporation Edmonton Journal | |
| 2018 | Justin Brake Mike de Souza (Honourable mention) Charles Rusnell, Jennie Russell and Gary Cunliffe (honourable mentions) | The Independent of Newfoundland and Labrador The National Observer Canadian Broadcasting Corporation | |
| 2019 | Michael Robinson Marie-Maude Denis (honorable mention) | The Telegraph Journal in Saint John, N.B Radio-Canada | |
| 2020 | Kenneth Jackson Michael de Adder (honorable mention) Joan Baxter (honorable mention) | Aboriginal Peoples Television Network | |
| 2021 | Nathan VanderKlippe Sarah Cox Kevin Donovan (certificate of merit) Meghan Potkins & Madeline Smith (certificates of merit) | Globe and Mail The Narwhal Toronto Star The Calgary Herald | |
| 2022 | Fatima Syed and Tai Huyn | The Local | |

=== Spencer Moore Award for Lifetime Achievement ===
| Year | Name | Employer/Role | Reference |
|---|---|---|---|
| 2014 | Arnold Amber | Canadian Journalists for Free Expression | |
| 2015 | Bob Carty | Canadian Broadcasting Corporation | |
| 2016 | Suzanne Legault | Information Commissioner of Canada | |
| 2017 | Jim Bronskill | The Canadian Press | |
| 2018 | Charles Morrow | The Canadian Committee for World Press Freedom | |
| 2019 | Ken Rubin | n/a (freelance) | |
| 2020 | David Pugliese | The Ottawa Citizen | |
| 2021 | Kim Bolan | Vancouver Sun | |
| 2023 | Rachel Pulfer | Journalists for Human Rights | |

== See also ==
- Reporters without Borders and their Press Freedom Index
- World Press Freedom Day
