= Anti-austerity movement =

Opposition to austerity measures, especially in Europe

The anti-austerity movement refers to the mobilisation of street protests and grassroots campaigns that has happened across various countries, especially in Europe, since the onset of the worldwide Great Recession.

Anti-austerity actions are varied and ongoing, and can be either sporadic and loosely organized or longer-term and tightly organized. They continue to the present day. The global Occupy movement has arguably been the most noticeable physical manifestation of anti-austerity and populist sentiment.

== Political impact ==
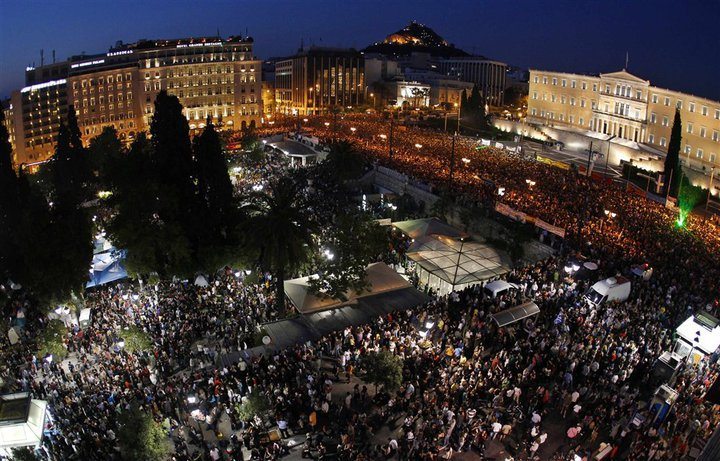
100,000 anti-austerity protesters in front of the Greek parliament in 2011

Since the onset of the economic recession in Europe, the political establishment response has increasingly focused on austerity: attempts to bring down budget deficits and control the rise of debt. The anti-austerity movement has responded by giving rise to a wave of anti-establishment political parties. Opposition to austerity is seen as the force behind the rise of Podemos in Spain, Italy's Five Star Movement and the Syriza party in Greece.

Ahead of the Scottish independence referendum in 2014, the Scottish Government pledged to end austerity in an independent Scotland.

Economist Thomas Piketty welcomed the political reaction to austerity, saying the rise of anti-austerity parties is "good news for Europe". According to Piketty, European countries tried to get rid of their deficits too quickly, resulting in a situation where "their citizens have suffered the consequences in the shape of austerity policies. It's good to reduce deficits, but at a rate that's commensurate with growth and economic recovery, but here growth has been killed off."

== Examples ==
- The global Occupy movement.
- The May–July 2011 Greek protests, also known as the "Indignant Citizens Movement" or the "Greek indignados", started demonstrating throughout Greece on 25 May 2011; the movement's largest demonstration was on 5 June, with 300,000 people gathering in front of the Greek Parliament, while the organizers put the number to 500,000. The protests lasted for over a month without any violent incidents, while on 29 June 2011, amid a violent police crackdown and accusations of police brutality by international media and Amnesty International, the square was evacuated but demonstrations continued the next day despite the crackdown; they officially ended on 7 August 2011, but resumed in October.
- The 2011 Spanish protests, whose participants are sometimes referred to as the "indignados", are a series of ongoing anti-austerity demonstrations in Spain that rose to prominence beginning on 15 May 2011; thus, the movement is also sometimes referred to as the May 15 or M-15 movement as well. It is a collection of several different instances of continuous demonstrations countrywide, with a common origin in internet social networks and the Democracia Real Ya web presence, along with 200 other small associations.
- In late March 2011 the Portuguese Prime Minister resigned a few hours after the latest austerity bill he backed was rejected by the rest of government. The government called that particular austerity round unacceptable. In his resignation speech, José Sócrates expressed concern that an IMF bailout akin to Greece and Ireland would now be unavoidable.
- In mid-March 2011 the British Medical Association held an emergency meeting at which it broadly decided to emphatically oppose pending legislation in the British Parliament, the Health and Social Care Bill, that would overhaul the functioning of the National Health Service. Dr Layla Jader, a public health physician, said: "The NHS needs evolution not revolution - these reforms are very threatening to the future of the NHS. If they go through, our children will look back and say how could you allow this to happen?" And Dr Barry Miller, an anaesthetist from Bolton, added: "The potential to do phenomenal damage is profound. I haven't seen any evidence these proposals will improve healthcare in the long-term." There have also been various grassroots groups of UK citizenry virulently opposing the pending new bill, including NHS Direct Action, 38 Degrees, and the trade union Unite.
- The 2010 UK student protests mark the coming into force of one of the United Kingdom's most severe austerity measures. On 9 December 2010 spending for higher education and tuition subsidies and assistance in English universities — historically rather substantial in scale — was cut by a total of 80%. That announcement and its implications, which included a near-tripling of student tuition fees from their previous levels up to a new ceiling of £9000/year, led to a huge backlash amongst students who almost immediately took to the streets over various non-sequential days against this announcement, squaring off with police on several occasions including an instance where some students angrily entered the Conservative headquarters and smashed windows and destroyed its interior. On the day of the passage of the measure itself, there was an explosion of street violence by enraged students and their allies, especially in London. There is an ongoing law enforcement investigation into, and even active pursuing of, the participants of the violence over the various protest days, with particular attention focusing on the moments when a number of protesters successfully attacked a royal car driving on its way to a London event, although they did not injure its occupants. Shouts of "off with their heads" were reportedly heard. On 25 March 2011, Charlie Gilmour, son of Pink Floyd guitarist David Gilmour, became one of the more high-profile individuals to be officially charged in relation to those events. As a result of these protests, a number of groups formed to combat the austerity measures that began with the cuts to higher education. One such example is Bloomsbury Fightback!, which is a group of radical students and workers in Bloomsbury, London, centred on the Bloomsbury Colleges in the University of London and focusing on organising around education and employment issues, of which many are the result of the austerity measures.
- The group UK Uncut is one outgrowth of the anger felt by average citizens at austerity, albeit the group focuses not so much on combating the cuts themselves as on demanding that the rich, rather than the poor, pay the shortfalls causing the austerity in the first place — a sort of "tax the rich" movement. UK Uncut attempts to organise flash mob protests inside the highest-profile buildings of the businesses of the rich people avoiding tax or paying less than they should.
- Around the same time as the heating-up of the England protests (but before the passing of the bill), students in Italy occupied the Leaning Tower of Pisa in a similar protest regarding its own educational system.
- On 27 November 2010, a massive protest against pending austerity took place in Dublin; The Irish Examiner news service also reports on a 7 December 2010 clash around the Dáil where protesters threw smoke bombs and flares at police. Additionally, La Scala in Italy experienced a clash on 8 December 2010 including scuffles with police.
- More generally, throughout 2009 and 2010, workers and students in Greece and other European countries demonstrated against cuts to pensions, public services and education spending as a result of government austerity measures. There was a brief airport strike in Spain in December 2010, and assorted brief "general strike"-like actions in France have taken place, particularly around the very controversial plan of the French government to raise the retirement age from 60 to 62, a proposal which eventually successfully passed.
- Further protests taken place in Greece, Portugal and the UK have continued throughout 2011 and 2012, including in Nigeria with major large street clashes against the withdrawal of fuel subsidies. There was also a major protest in London by UK groups from across that country on 26 March 2011, centred on a protest call initially made by the Trades Union Congress but subsequently involving many other groups.
- Participants in more militant forms of protest engaged in during 26 March demonstration, who in total only comprised 1,500 people out of the estimated 250,000-500,000 total participants, have been relentlessly attacked by the government as "mindless thugs" with the UK's mainstream media including the BBC generally supporting this perception. This remains the case even though the fundamental seriousness of damage thus far remains debatable; much reporting seems to have focused on the smashing of a Santander bank branch's glass entranceway doors by largely anarchist activists, who would have also been behind the simultaneous destruction of several automated teller machines and the scrawling of "class war" in graffiti on neighbouring walls.
- By July 2014 there was still anger and protests in Greece about the austerity measures implemented there, with a 24-hour strike among government workers on 9 July 2014, timed to coincide with an audit by inspectors from the International Monetary Fund, the European Union and European Central Bank. Protests continued and, indeed, escalated in Ireland in 2014, as the government attempted to implement additional water taxes to its austerity program, with at least one senior politician, the deputy prime minister, even being "kidnapped".

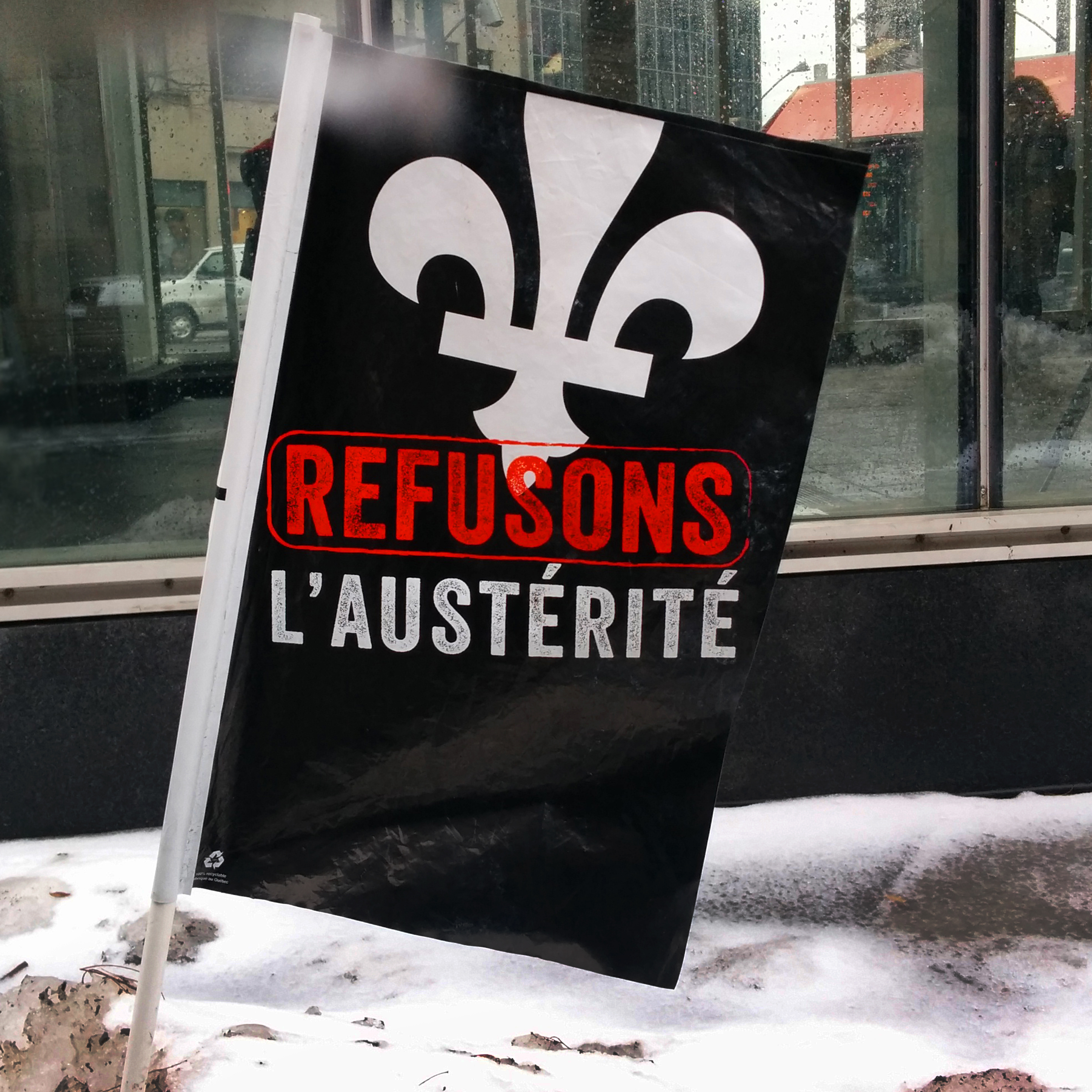
Flag commonly used in demonstrations against austerity in Quebec in 2015 and 2016

- 8 March 2015 – On International Women's Day, feminist groups got together in Québec City, Canada to protest against the austerity measures announced by the Couillard government. The goal of the protest was to raise awareness about the impact of austerity policies in reinforcing gender inequalities in the economy. Since the economic crisis of 2008, 23 billion $ were cut from the Québec economy. A study conducted by IRIS (Institut de recherche et d’informations socio-économiques) showed that 13 billion dollars of these cuts impacted women more specifically, in comparison to 3 billion dollars for men. The protestors claimed that government investment privilege sectors dominated by men like construction and resources by accelerating the PQI (Quebec Infrastructure Plan) and by introducing the Plan Nord. The areas where the most cuts can be noticed are in the ones that hold the most female workers including health care, education and public services. The protest was held in front of the Treasury Board offices. Women from the CRMMF (Coalition régionale de la marche mondiale des femmes) threw hundreds of belts at the office doors to symbolise that women are tired of having to tighten their belts. In response to the protest Alexa Conradi, President of the Fédération des femmes du Québec, argued that austerity policies needed to be re-evaluated to prevent women's status to regress like it did in England, France and Greece where similar programs were put in place.
- 19 March 2015 – German demonstrators clashed with police at an anti-austerity protest during the inauguration ceremony for the European Central Bank's new headquarters in Frankfurt. Police put up barricades and barbed wire around the bank headquarters as they braced for demonstrations against government austerity measures and capitalism. Protesters targeted the ECB because of the bank's role in supervising efforts to restrain spending and reduce debt in financially troubled countries such as Greece.
- 20 June 2015 – "Westminster was gripped by dissent on Saturday, as around a quarter of a million protestors poured onto the streets of London, condemning austerity’s assault on human rights, the economy and the environment..." Jo Michell, lecturer in economics at the University of the West of England, told RT that "None of this [Austerity] is necessary. There is no debt crisis. Austerity is being used as a smokescreen to cover an ideologically-driven attack on the majority of the British public." ‘End Austerity Now’: Protesters speak out as '250k' decry savage Westminster cuts. Russia Today, 21 June 2015
- 31 March 2016 – Nuit debout, a French social movement that emerged from opposition to the 2016 neoliberal labor reforms known as the El Khomri law, began on 31 March 2016.
- May 2019 - Unframed Lives is a photographic exhibition, panel event and installation for Brighton Fringe. It's a creative collaboration between people who have experienced homelessness under austerity as a resistance project. It shows the use of art and research as a community dialogue to reflect on the lived experience of homeless people under austerity.

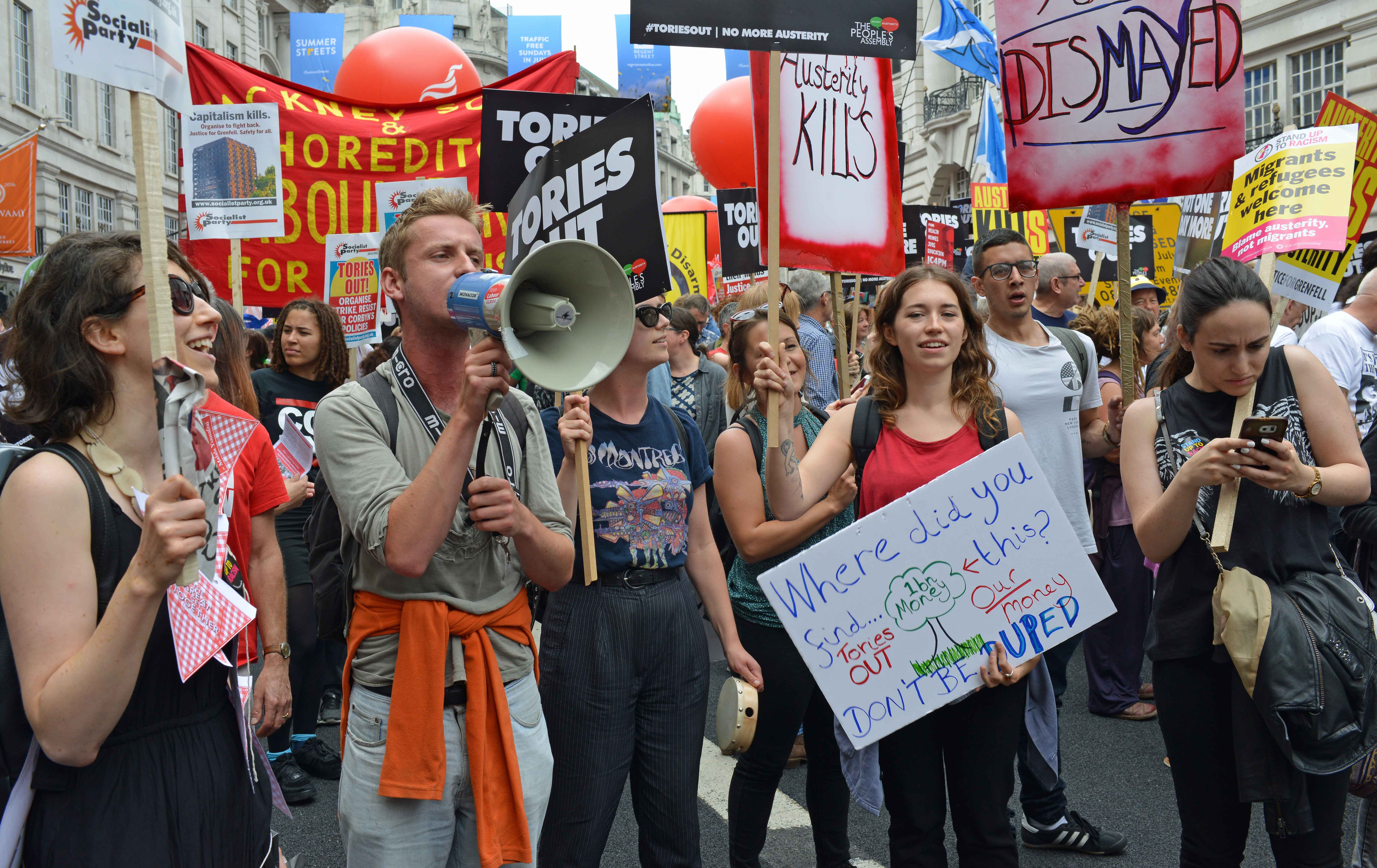
Anti-austerity march in London, 2017

== Perspectives ==
Some economists, like Nobel Prize winning Princeton economist Paul Krugman, argue that austerity measures tend to be counterproductive when applied to the populations and programs they are usually applied to. The fact that the political sphere has been so heavily influenced by a paper known as "Growth in a Time of Debt" based on flawed methodology has led Krugman to argue:

What the Reinhart–Rogoff affair shows is the extent to which austerity has been sold on false pretenses. For three years, the turn to austerity has been presented not as a choice but as a necessity. Economic research, austerity advocates insisted, showed that terrible things happen once debt exceeds 90 percent of G.D.P. But "economic research" showed no such thing; a couple of economists made that assertion, while many others disagreed. Policy makers abandoned the unemployed and turned to austerity because they wanted to, not because they had to.

In October 2012, the International Monetary Fund announced that its forecasts for countries which implemented austerity programs have been consistently overoptimistic.
