= Léonie Couture =

Léonie Couture CQ
- Born: 1951 (age 74–75); Saint-Georges, Quebec
- Education: Laval University
- Organization: Herstreet
- Known for: Helping homeless women

Léonie Couture CQ (born 1951 in Saint-Georges, Quebec) is a Canadian feminist activist. She is the founder and director of Herstreet (French: La rue des Femmes), an organization designed to help homeless women, mainly in the Montreal area.

== Biography ==
Léonie Couture obtained a bachelor's degree in administration from Laval University, and completed certificate training in psychology at the Université de Montréal and the Université du Québec à Montréal (UQAM).

Couture was initially a consultant in organizational development (1976–77), then joined the Public Service Commission in Ottawa from 1977 to 1979. From 1979 to 1981, she became Assistant Director of Nursing at the hospital centre of Outaouais.

Couture became involved in community movements in 1981. She worked in the Movement Against Rape and Incest until 1987, promoted literacy until 1991, and then joined the Centre for Women's Health from 1991 to 1993. She devoted herself to the cause of homeless women in 1994 and founded the organization Herstreet (French: La rue des Femmes).

Seeing homelessness as foremost a health issue, Couture created Herstreet to not only provide emergency shelter and meals but to provide psychological help to rebuild their lives. The organization enables 400 women to leave the street each year with the help of 40 employees and more than 150 volunteers.

Couture participated in the activities of many community support groups and networks, and was a member of the board of directors of the Fédération des femmes du Québec, where she served for three years, organizing the Marche mondiale des Femmes (World March of Women). She is a member of the board of the Ville-Marie Social Development Corporation.

== Honours and distinctions ==
- 2009 – Persiller-Lachapelle Award
- 2010 – Prix Idola Saint-Jean of the Fédération des femmes du Québec
- 2011 – Prix Thérèse-Daviau
- 2012 – Chavalière of the Ordre national du Québec
- 2013 – Named one of the 10 most influential women of Quebec by La Presse
