= Inger Hansen =

Information Commissioner of Canada
- In office 1983–1990
- Preceded by: Position established
- Succeeded by: John W. Grace

1st Privacy Commissioner of Canada
- In office 1977–1983
- Preceded by: Position established
- Succeeded by: John W. Grace

Personal details
- Born: May 11, 1929 Copenhagen, Denmark
- Died: September 28, 2013 (aged 84) Ottawa, Canada

Inger Hansen (11 May 1929 — 28 September 2013) was the first Privacy Commissioner of Canada from 1977 to 1983 and Information Commissioner of Canada from 1983 to 1990. Hansen was also the first ombudswoman for Kingston Penitentiary in 1973 and became a Commander of the Order of the Dannebrog in 2000.

== Early life and education ==
Hansen was born on 11 May 1929 in Copenhagen, Denmark. In 1960, she graduated from the University of British Columbia with a Bachelor of Law. Hansen completed further education with a public administration degree at Queen's University in 1990.

== Career ==
Hansen worked for a publishing house in Denmark before moving to Canada in 1950. Once in Canada, Hansen held multiple jobs before beginning her law studies in 1956. After graduating in 1960, Hansen began her law career. After working in British Columbia as a criminal defense lawyer, Hansen worked for the Solicitor General of Canada in 1969.

While in Ontario, Hansen became the ombudswoman of Kingston Penitentiary after the position was created in 1973. In 1977, Hansen was named the first Privacy Commissioner of Canada. Despite being reelected for an additional four years in 1981, her position as commissioner ended in 1983 after the creation of Canada's Privacy Act. When her term ended, Hansen became the inaugural Information Commissioner of Canada in 1983 and held the position until 1990. After her time as information commissioner, Hansen began working for the Ontario Court of Justice in 1991 and remained in the Ontario justice system until 2003.

== Death ==
Hansen died on 28 September 2013 in Ottawa, Canada.

== Awards and honours ==
Hansen was named a Commander of the Order of the Dannebrog in 2000.
