= Micheline Dumont =

Micheline Dumont may refer to:

- Michelle Dumon (sometimes recorded as Dumont, 1921–2017), member of the Belgian Resistance during World War II
- Micheline Dumont (historian) (born 1935), Canadian historian, lecturer and professor
