= Idola Saint-Jean =

Canadian journalist, educator and feminist

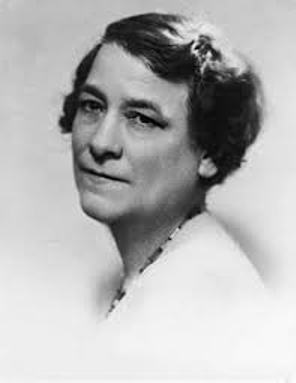
- Idola Saint-Jean
- Born: May 19, 1880; Montreal, Quebec, Canada
- Died: April 6, 1945 (aged 64); Montreal, Quebec, Canada
- Known for: Getting women the right to vote in Quebec.

Idola Saint-Jean (May 19, 1880 – April 6, 1945) was a Quebec journalist, educator and feminist. She devoted her life to the pursuit of equal rights for women in Quebec and her efforts lead to women being given the right to vote in Quebec in 1940.

== Life ==
Saint-Jean was born in Canada and taught in the French studies department at McGill University. She was secretary for the board of the Montréal Juvenile Court and was named to the Commission du salaire minimum des femmes du Québec in 1925. In 1927, Saint-Jean founded the Alliance canadienne pour le vote des femmes au Québec. She was among the group of women who met with Quebec premier Louis-Alexandre Taschereau to demand that women be given the right to vote. She returned before the Quebec National Assembly each subsequent year until 1940, when women finally won the right to vote.

In 1930, she ran unsuccessfully for a seat in the Canadian House of Commons as an independent candidate in Saint-Denis, finishing third.

Saint-Jean died in Montreal at the age of 64.

In 2016, she was one of five finalist to be on Canadian banknotes, a competition closed to men. She ultimately lost to civil rights activist Viola Desmond.

== Legacy ==
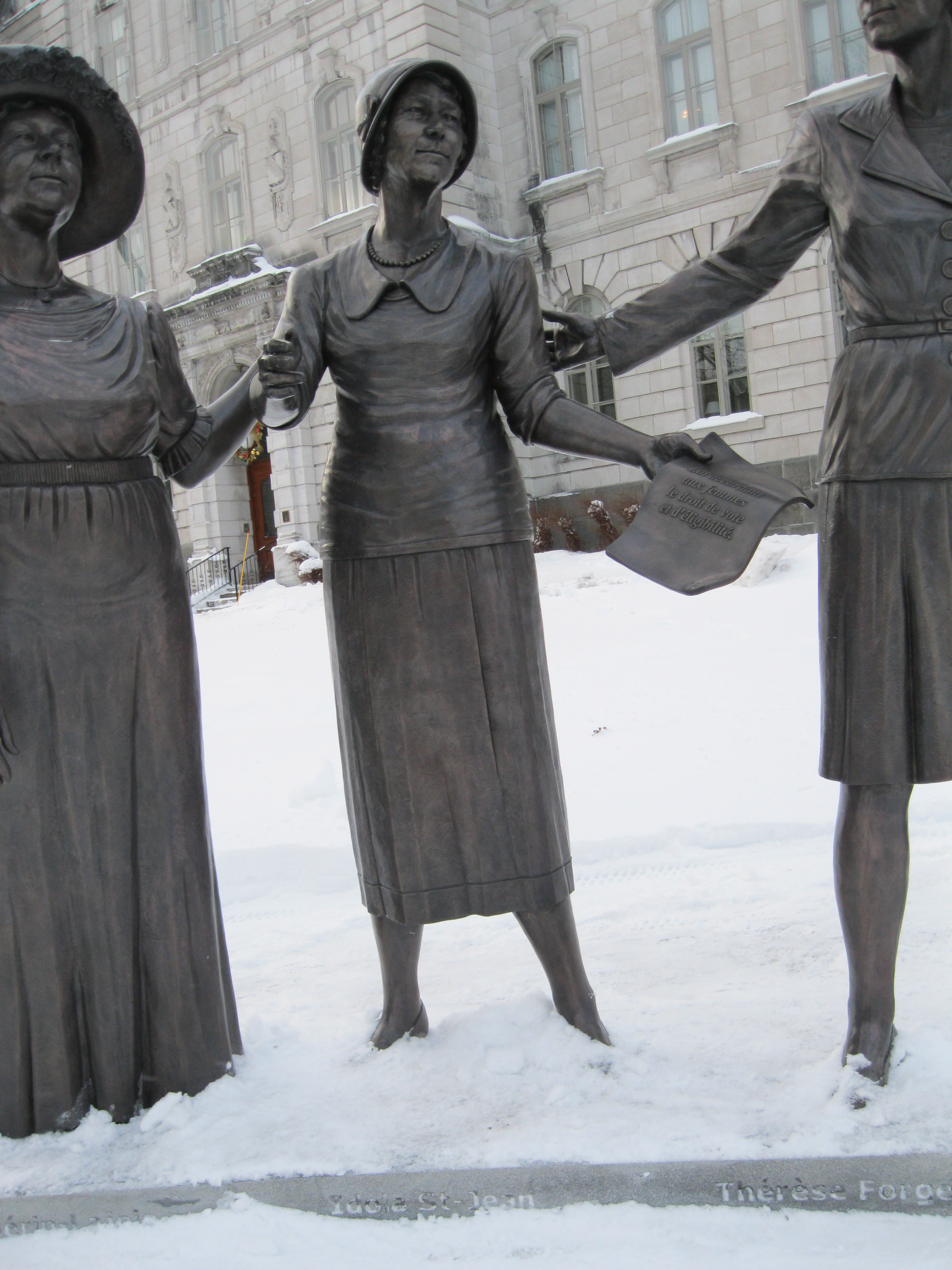
The statue in front of the National Assembly of Saint-Jean, Thérèse Casgrain and Marie-Claire Kirkland.

The Rue Idola-Saint-Jean in Sherbrooke and Parc Idola-Saint-Jean in Montreal were named in her honour.

The Prix Idola St-Jean is awarded by the Fédération des femmes du Québec to a woman or group of women who have made a significant contribution to improving conditions for Quebec women.

In March 1981, a Canadian stamp was issued depicting Idola St-Jean.

In 2012, Quebec Premier Pauline Marois unveiled a statue of Saint-Jean, Thérèse Casgrain and Marie-Claire Kirkland. The statue by Jules Lasalle was to celebrate the 50th anniversary of Kirkland being made the first Canadian female minister.
