= François Audet =

Canadian scholar

François Audet is a Canadian academician who dedicated himself in humanitarian aid in which he worked for 15 years before starting an academic career.

He is the founder and director of the Canadian Observatory on Crises and Humanitarian Action (OCCAH), attached to the School of Management Sciences (ESG) at the Université du Québec à Montréal since 2012.

François Audet obtained a doctorate from École nationale d'administration publique (National School of Public Administration). He regularly works with the media to analyze and discuss disasters and contemporary humanitarian issues.

== Publications ==
In addition to many articles, François Audet has published the following books:

- *Mobilités internationales et intervention interculturelle - International mobility and intercultural intervention Theories, experiences and practices, under the direction of Catherine Montgomery and Caterine Bourassa-Dansereau Presses of the University of Quebec, 2017 (ISBN 978-2-7605-4778-0)
- L’Aide canadienne au développement- Canadian Development Assistance•: Balance Sheet and Perspective (edited by M. E. Desrosiers and S. Roussel, University of Montreal Press, 2008, 352 p. 5 (ISBN 978-2-7606-2105-3)
- Nouvelles d’humanitaires-Humanitarian News, Les Malins Publishing, 2016, 264 p. 6 (ISBN 978-2-89657-440-7
- Comprendre les organisations humanitaires- Understanding humanitarian organizations, University of Quebec Press, 276 p. 7 (ISBN 978-2-7605-4598-4)

== Achievements ==
- Development of the program "Risk Management and Security in new contexts of insecurity" to Québec international cooperation organizations, in partnership with AQOCI and with the support of the Ministère des Relations internationales and La Francophonie.
- Visiting scholar for the Harvard University Program on Humanitarian Policy and Conflict Research (HPCR)
- Co-founder of the Canadian Humanitarian Partnership Conference in partnership with the Humanitarian Coalition and the International Development Research Center (IDRC), October 2013 and December 2014.
