= Javad Alizadeh =

Iranian professional cartoonist

Javad Alizadeh جواد
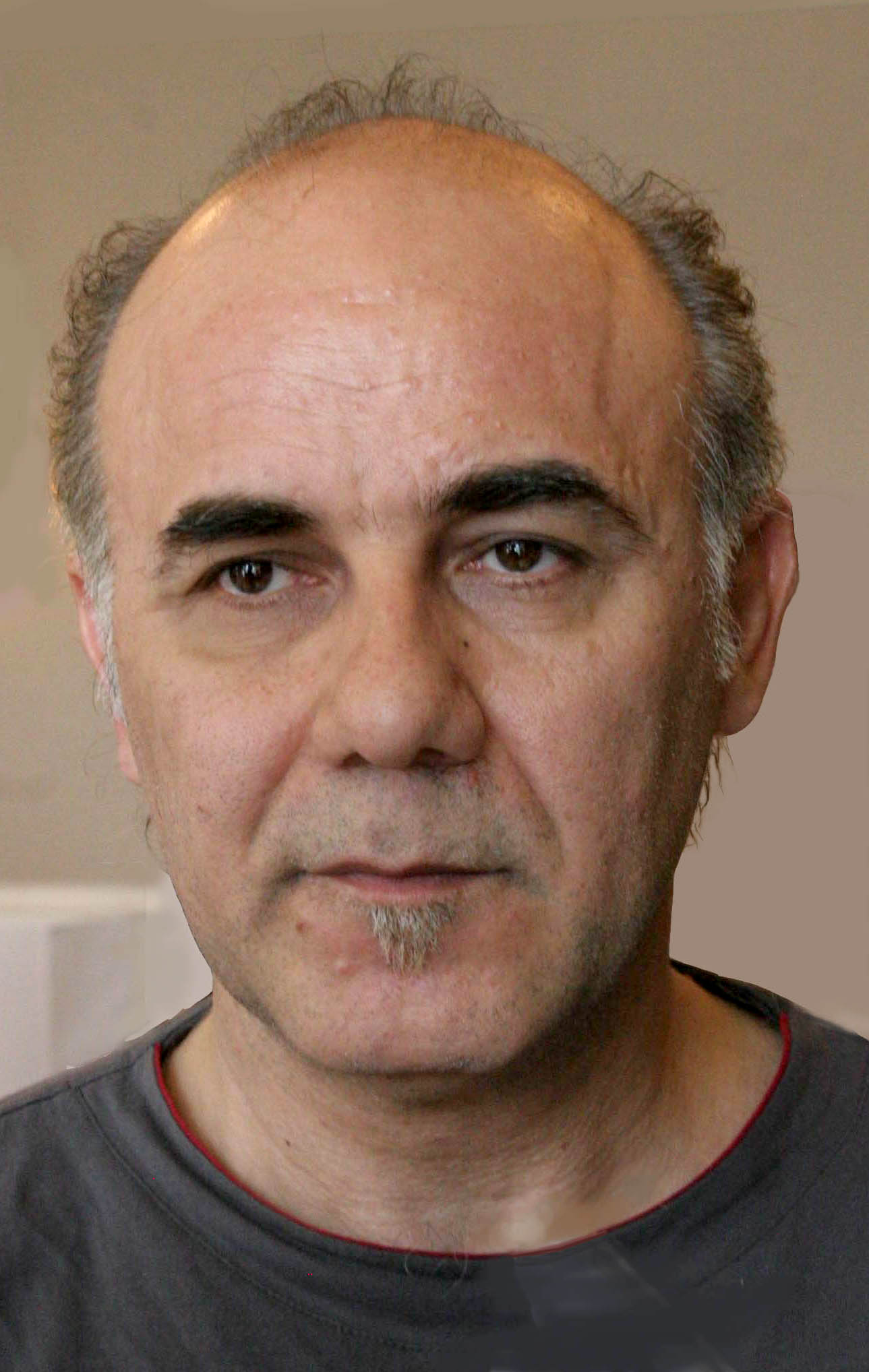
- Born: 9 January 1953 (age 73) Ardabil, Iran
- Area: Cartoonist
- Notable works: 4D Humor; Caricatures of comic actors; Caricatures of Hedayat; Mofasser-e Shout; World Cup Humors; TV Comics
- Awards: Silver Date of IFHB

Signature
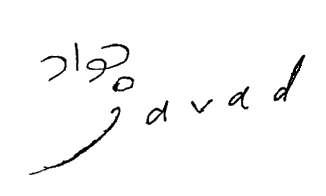

Javad Alizadeh (Persian: جواد علیزاده Javād Alīzādeh Persian pronunciation: [dʒævɒːd(-e) æliːˈzɒːde]; professional name: Javad; born 9 January 1953) is an Iranian professional cartoonist best known for his caricatures of politicians, comic actors, footballers, and for his scientific/philosophical column (including cartoons, caricatures and satire) titled 4D Humor, which has won awards from Italy, China and Japan. An active artist since 1970, his works have been published in international publications. He is the founder of the leading monthly cartoon magazine Humor & Caricature and is its founding and current publisher and editor-in-chief.

== Early life ==
Caricatures can decrease violence and bring cultures closer. They aim to promote peace and teach us to be moderate and laugh at our problems.

Javad Alizadeh

Alizadeh was born on 9 January 1953 in Ardebil, northwestern Iran, and graduated BA in English translation. Influenced by his university degree, he considers writing and drawing cartoons as a tool that can translate sufferings, hardships and the mysteries of life into humorous language.

In 1990 he founded his monthly cartoon magazine Humor & Caricature and since then he has been the editor and publisher of this independent and private publication. This humorous magazine publishes both pictorial and written humor about various subjects such as politics, sports, cinema, music and philosophy. Prominent cartoonists such as Bahman Abdi, Ali Derakhshi, Ali Miraeee and Bahar Mowahed, and humorists such as Rouhollah Zamzameh have collaborated with this magazine. According to the official website of the magazine, the purpose of the publication is "to promote peace, laughter, tolerance, moderation and multidimensional and multilateral insight in Iranian society".

Alizadeh has also attended numerous cartoon conferences in Japan, Malta, Turkey, Bulgaria, Finland, and has served on the jury of the Skopje 86, Anglet( France ) 91, Dubai 2002, Izmir 2008 cartoon festivals and Tehran Cartoon Biennial in 1993, 1995, 1997 and 2005. He has experimented with different styles and genres of humor such as editorial, gags, portrait caricatures and black caricatures, black humor, comic strips, sport humor, surrealistic and philosophical humor, and his works have been published in many leading foreign presses and publications in the 1980s and 1990s by C & W syndicate, including Who's Who in Satire and Humor, Nebelspalter, Chicago tribune, Courrier International, Graphis annual, Osten, Mondial.

A former staff writer and editor of the Witty World cartoon magazine, Alizadeh is a member of the international Cartoonists & Writers Syndicate. He also holds membership of the Good Humor Party, a humorous party in Poland.

== Mad Commentator ==
Alizadeh created a humorous mascot called Mad Commentator (Persian: مفسر شوت) who rose to fame after correctly "predicting" the result of the opening match between Argentina and Cameroon at the 1990 FIFA World Cup.

== 4D Humor ==
Influenced by Albert Einstein and Isaac Newton, he created a scientific/philosophical cartoon on the Theory of Relativity titled 4D Humor. He has also published a column (including cartoons, caricatures and satire) in his monthly magazine of the same title.

In 2005 the website of the World Year of Physics carried a link to his cartoons about relativism on its "play physics page", showing his scientific cartoons.

In October 2008, his scientific cartoon on twin paradox in special relativity was shown and studied in the reading class and conference held by CERN Courier.com (The International Journal of High-Energy Physics site) in Trieste, Italy.

== Awards ==
Alizadeh has won some 30 prizes in international cartoon festivals, including:

- First Caricature Prize in Anglet Cartoon Festival, France (1990)
- Silver Date prize in International Festival of the Humor of Bordighera, Italy (1996)
- First Cartoon Prize in Ankara 7-77 Cartoon for the children Festival, Turkey (2007)
- First cartoon prize in Istanbul Aydin dogan cartoon festival, Turkey (2012)
- Honorable mentions at the United Nations/Ranan Lurie Political Cartoon Awards (2016)
- First Caricature Prize in Gallarate Contest, Italy (2019)

== Bibliography ==
Year	English title	Persian	Pages	Notes
1977	Image of Hedayat	Tasvīr-e Hedāyat	-	Portraits of Sadegh Hedayat
1980	Shootball!	Šūtbāl!	-	Cartoons about Football
1980	Hundred Jokes, Hundred Cartoons	Sad Latīfeh, Sad Kārton	-	-
1982	World Cup Humors	Tanzhā-ye Jām-e Jahānī	-	Cartoons on 1982 World Cup
1984	TV Comics/Cartoons	-	-	-
1984	Serious Cartoons	Kārikāturhā-ye Jeddī	-	Black humor cartoons
1985	News-maker Politicians	Siyāsatmadārān-e Xabarsāz		Portraits of Politicians
1985	Cinema Comedians	Komediyanhā-ye Sīnemā	-	Portraits of comic actors
1986	World Cup Humors	Tanzhā-ye Jām-e Jahānī		Cartoons on 1986 World Cup
1987	TV Comics/Cartoons	-	-	
1988	Missile Humor under Missile Attacks!	Tanz-e – Mūšakī -		Black humor created during War of the Cities
1989	New Jokes, New Cartoons	Latifehā-ye Rūz, Kārtonhā-ye Rūz	-	-
1990	World Cup Humors	Tanzhā-ye Jām-e Jahānī		Cartoons on 1990 World Cup
1990	Joking with Einstein(4D Humor)	Šūkhī bā Einstein	-	Cartoons and humors on Albert Einstein's humorous character, Relativity theory, curvature of time/space, weight of light

== Gallery ==
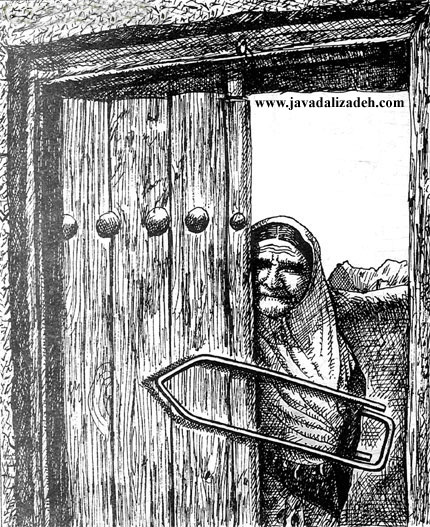
Attached to the Village

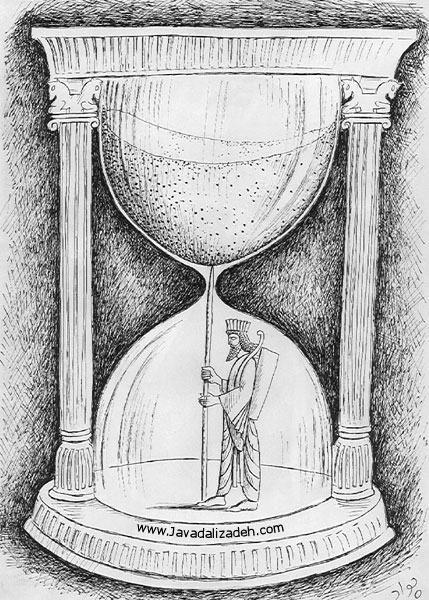
Ancient Iran

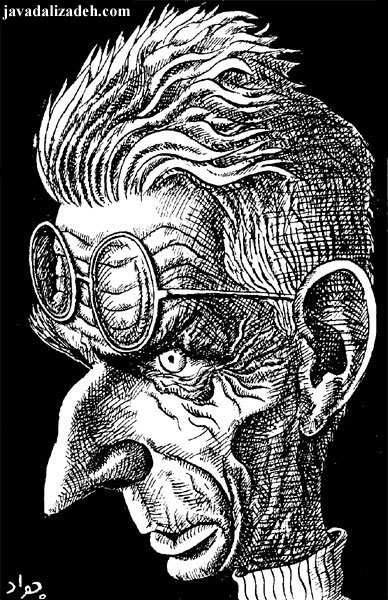
Samuel Beckett

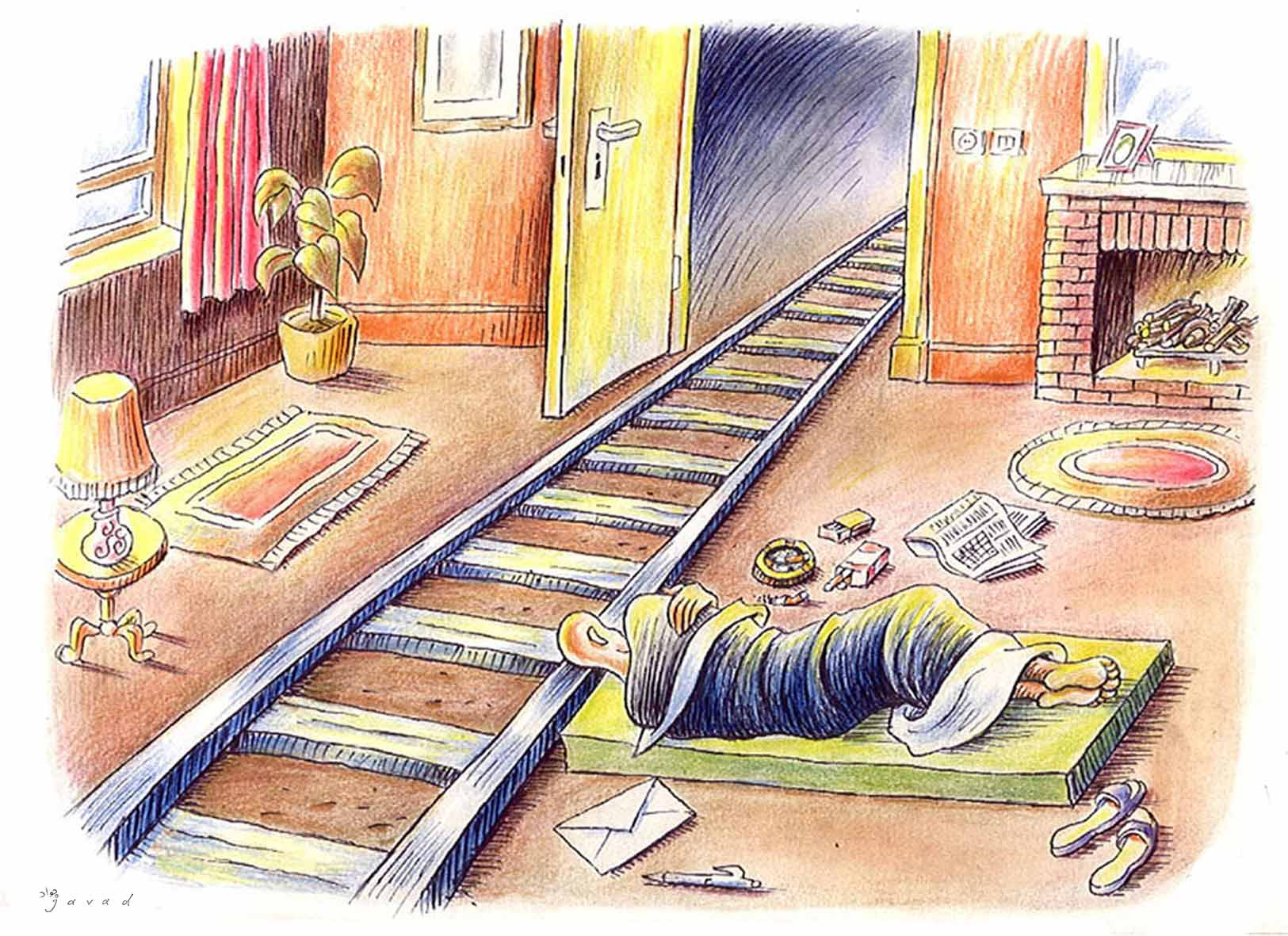
Surreal Suicide

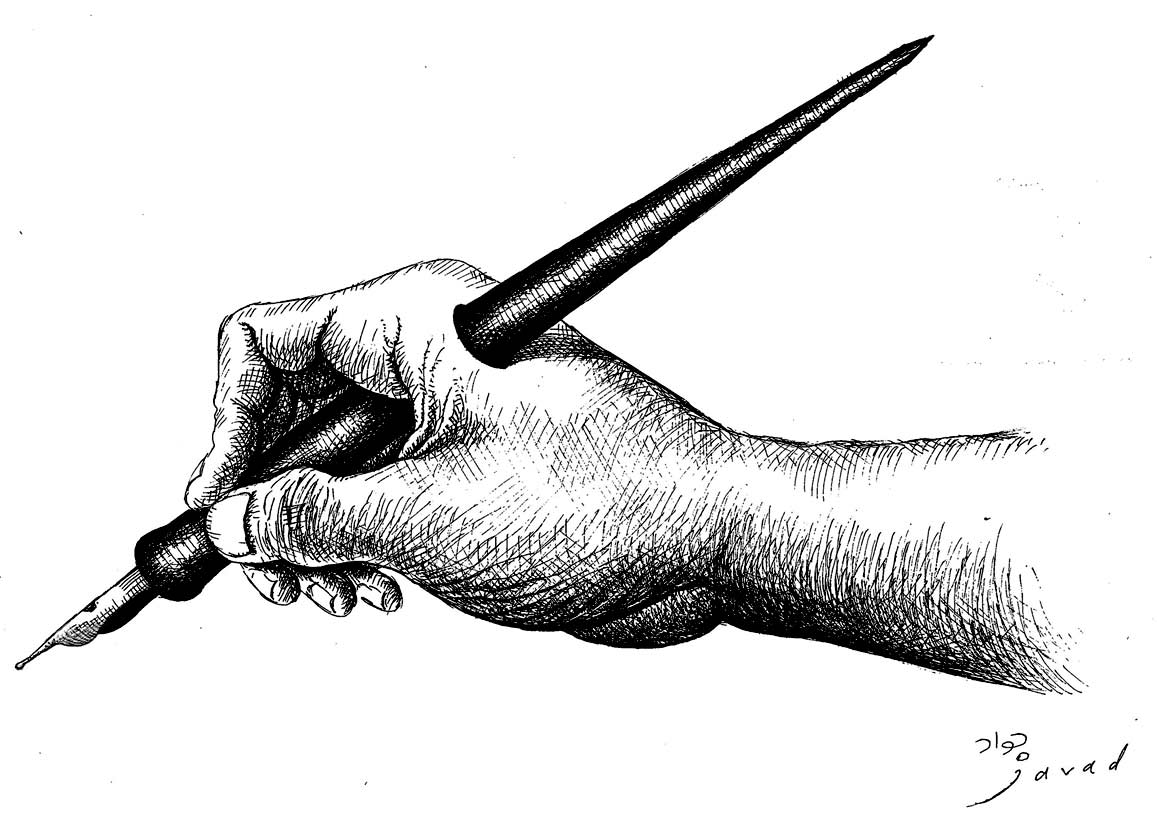
Penetrating Pen

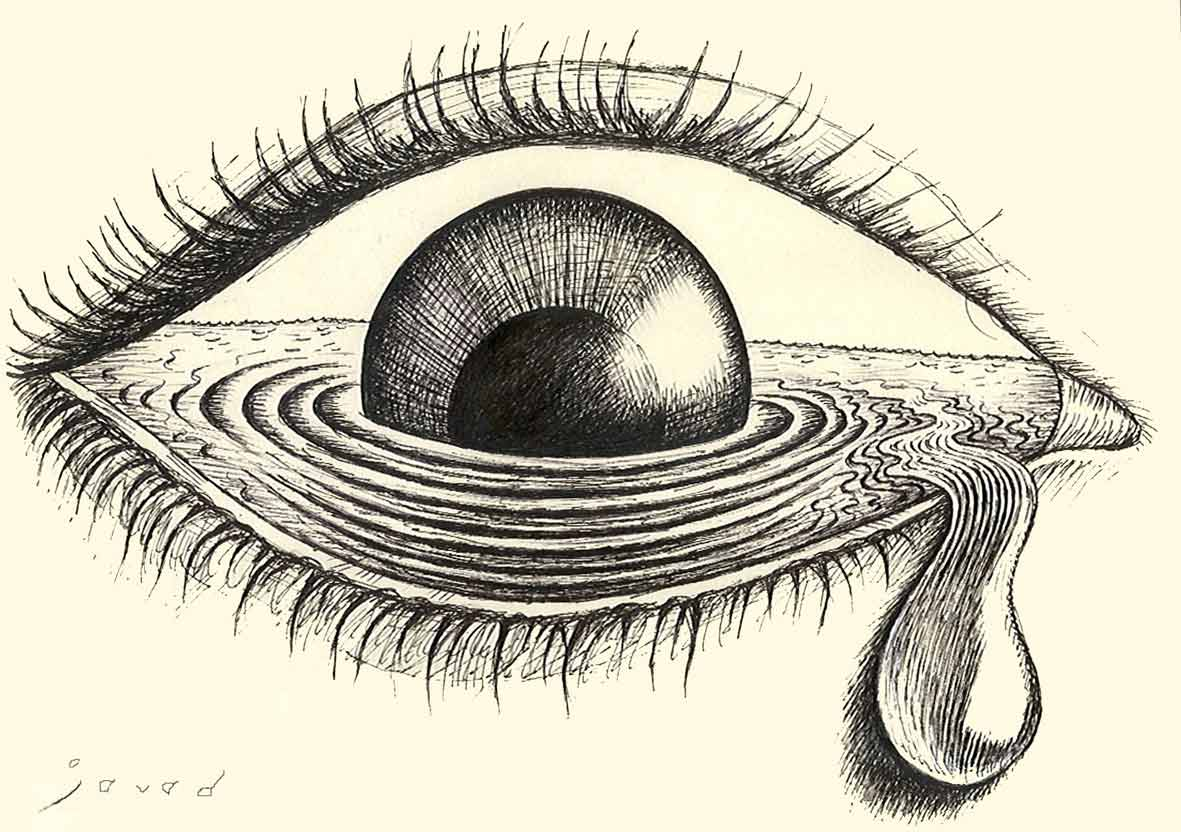
Ocean of Sorrow

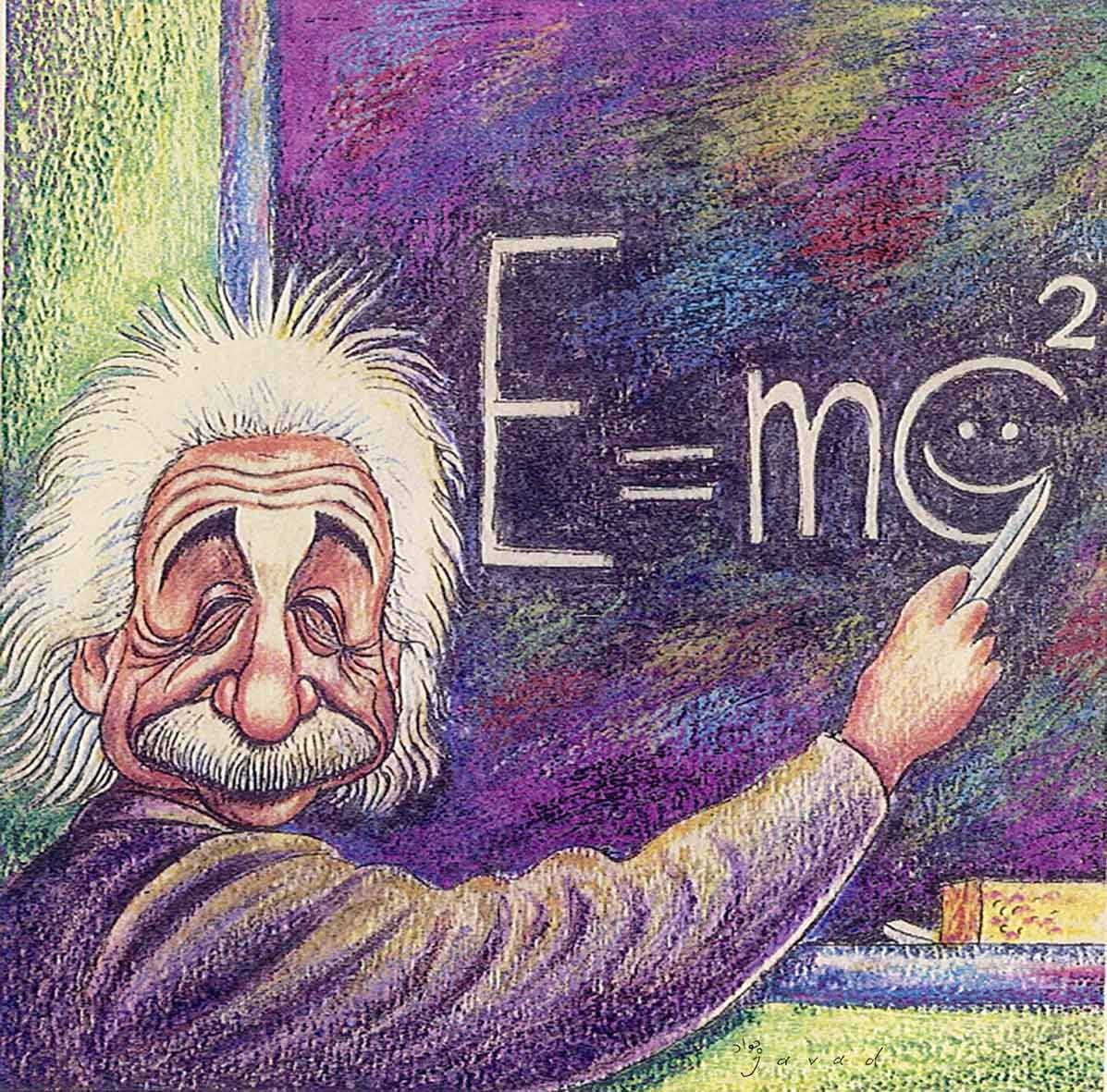
Joking on Amazing Formula

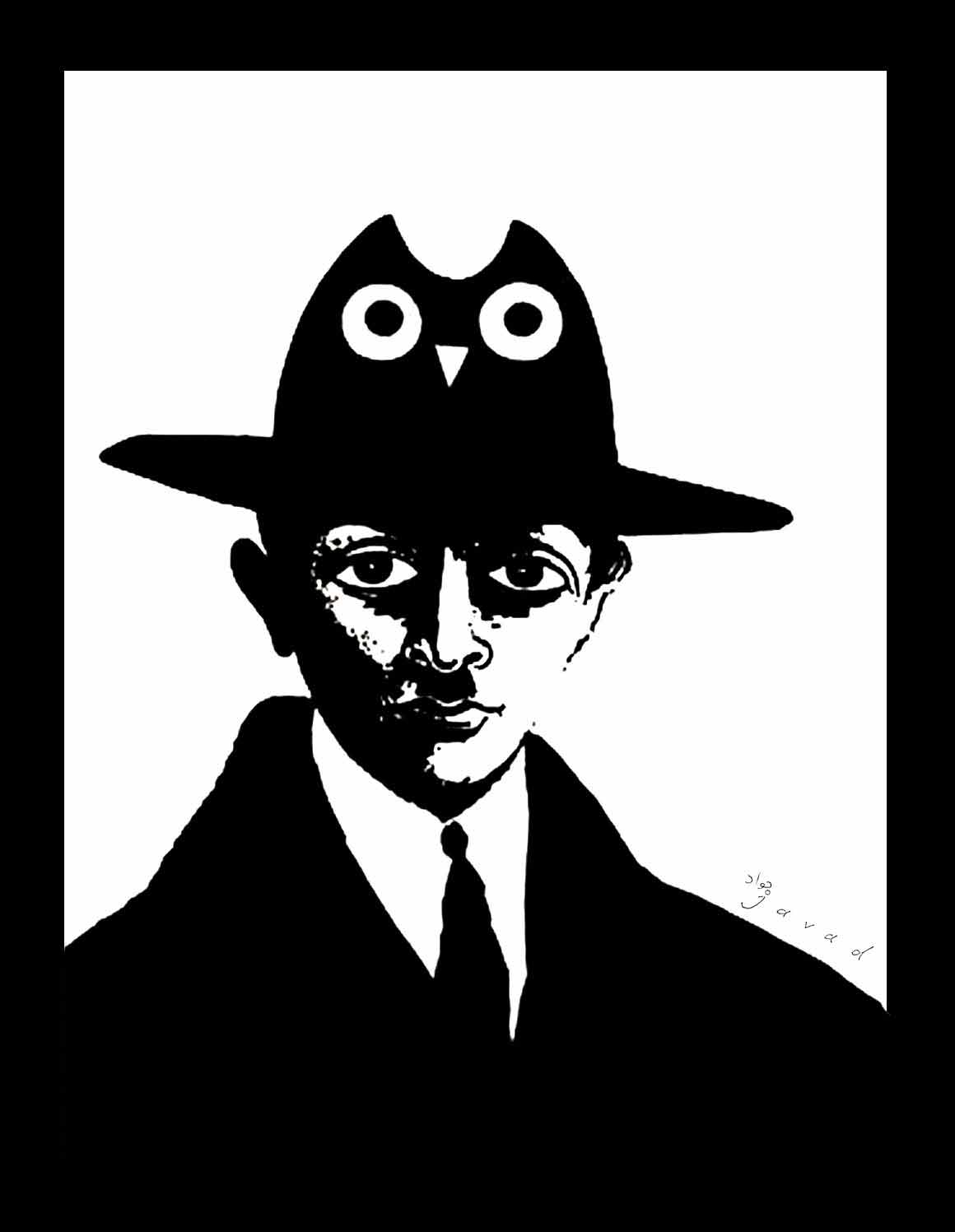
Hedayat, Black Novelist

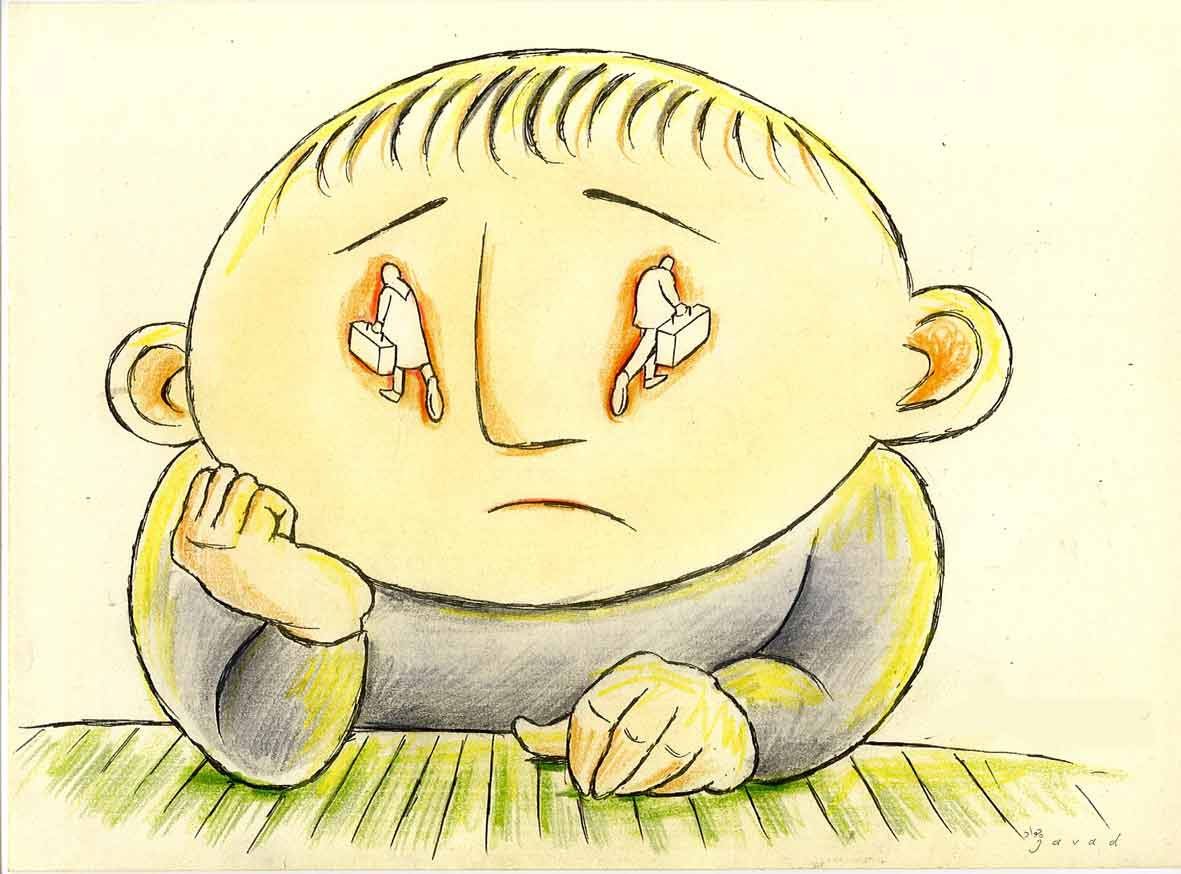
Divorce Child

== Documentaries ==
Three documentaries have been made about Javad Alizadeh:

- Profession: Cartoonist* (2007), directed by Rouhollah Zamzameh;
- Javad* (2019), directed by Jamshid Ebrazi;
- Davaj Paradiso* (2024), directed by Masoud Enami.

== See also ==
- Kioumars Saberi Foumani
