= Michèle Asselin =

Canadian activist

- Occupation: Activist

Michèle Asselin is a Canadian activist and former president of the Fédération des femmes du Québec.

== Career ==
In 1988, she became coordinator of the Regroupement des centres de femmes du Québec.

In June 2003, she succeeded Vivian Barbot as president of the Fédération des femmes du Québec. In September 2009, she stepped down as FFQ president after reaching the Federation's term limits for presidents. Upon stepping down, she re-affirmed her support for the Federation's opposition to the Quebec ban on religious symbols.

After leaving the FFQ, she served as coordinator for the Centre international de solidarité ouvrière from 2010 to 2015. In 2015, she was named as head of the Association québécoise des organismes de coopération internationale.
