= Prix Idola Saint-Jean =

The Prix Idola Saint-Jean is a prize awarded by the Fédération des femmes du Québec to recognize a woman or group of women who have made a significant contribution to improve conditions for women and to advance feminism in Quebec. It was first awarded in 1991.

The prize was named in honour of Idola Saint-Jean, who helped gain the right to vote for women in Quebec.

== Prize recipients ==
- 1991 - Collective Par et Pour Elle inc. de Cowansville
- 1992 - Simonne Monet-Chartrand
- 1993 - Madeleine Parent
- 1994 - Nicole Dorin
- 1995 - Participants in the Du Pain et des Roses walk
- 1996 - Regroupement provincial des maisons d'hébergement et de transition pour femmes victimes de violence conjugale
- 1997 - Madeleine Lévesque et Shree Mulay
- 1998 - Centre de femmes L'Éclaircie de la Montérégie
- 1999 - Ruth Rose
- 2000 - Collectif des femmes immigrantes
- 2001 - Vivian Labrie
- 2002 - Centre d'éducation et d'action des femmes (CÉAF)
- 2003 - Éditions du remue-ménage
- 2006 - Ana-Maria Seghezzo D'Urbano
- 2007 - Intersyndicale des femmes with special mention of : L’autre Parole and la Table régionale des groupes de femmes Gaspésie–Îles-de-la-Madeleine
- 2008 - Gisèle Bourret and Nicole Boily
- 2009 - Regroupement des centres de femmes du Québec
- 2010 - Léonie Couture and France Cormier
- 2011 - Regroupement des femmes de la Côte-de-Gaspé
- 2012 - Micheline Dumont
