= Chantal Bernier =

Canadian politician

interim Privacy Commissioner of Canada
- In office 3 December 2013 – 28 May 2014
- Preceded by: Jennifer Stoddart
- Succeeded by: Daniel Therrien

Chantal Bernier was the interim Privacy Commissioner of Canada from 2013 to 2014. Prior to her position, Bernier joined the Bar of Quebec in 1978 before starting her Canadian government experience in the early 1990s. During the early to late 1990s, she was an advisor for the Immigration and Refugee Board of Canada and Department of Justice. She also briefly worked as an operations director for the Privy Council Office in the late 1990s.

In the 2000s, Bernier held assistant deputy minister positrons with Indigenous and Northern Affairs Canada and Public Safety Canada. Upon joining the Office of the Privacy Commissioner of Canada in 2008, Bernier started out as an assistant privacy commissioner before holding her interim position. After ending her government tenure in 2014, Bernier became a privacy counsel for Dentons in 2014. she was awarded the Queen Elizabeth II Diamond Jubilee Medal in 2012.

== Education ==
Bernier graduated from a law program at the University of Sherbrooke in 1977 and a master's degree at the London School of Economics and Political Science in 1980.

== Career ==
Bernier began her career at the Bar of Quebec in 1978. Outside of law, she was an advisor for the Immigration and Refugee Board of Canada from 1993 to 1996 and the Department of Justice from 1996 to 1998. After briefly working at the Privy Council Office as an operations director for a year, Bernier was an assistant deputy minister for the Indigenous and Northern Affairs Canada until 2002. She continued working as an assistant deputy minister for Public Safety Canada until 2008.

Bernier began her career with the Office of the Privacy Commissioner of Canada as an assistant privacy commissioner in November 2008. During her time with the Privacy Commission, she became the interim Privacy Commissioner of Canada in the end of 2013 after Jennifer Stoddart left her position. Bernier was replaced by Daniel Therrien as the Privacy Commissioner in May 2014. After her tenure as interim Privacy Commissioner ended, Bernier joined the law firm Dentons as a privacy counsel in October 2014.

== Awards and honours ==
Bernier was awarded the Queen Elizabeth II Diamond Jubilee Medal in 2012.
