= Gabrielle Bouchard =

Canadian feminist

Gabrielle Bouchard (born 1968) is a Canadian feminist. From 2017 to 2020, she served as president of the Fédération des femmes du Québec, the first transgender woman to hold the position.

== Career ==
She previously worked for the Concordia University Centre for Gender Advocacy. She has been described as an intersectional feminist. In 2013, she led the centre in filing a court challenge against the Québec law on legal gender recognition, Centre for Gender Advocacy et al. v. AG. In 2016, she was part of a group that won the Concordia Council on Student Life Big Hairy Ideas Competition, winning a grant to lead a comprehensive audit on the inclusion of genders, sexualities and learning styles in Concordia policies and syllabi.

In November 2017, she was elected president of the Fédération des femmes du Québec, which represents 300 member organisations across Québec. She was the first transgender woman to be elected to the position in the history of the FFQ.

In May 2018, after the government of Québec announced an increase in the minimum wage to 12$ an hour, she called for a further increase to 15$, stating that "we have mostly women, of all ages, in a variety of jobs, who are at minimum wage and will stay at minimum wage for a very long time."

While president of the FFQ, she came under controversy several times for her tendency to make provocative posts on social media, including a tweet in June 2019 saying "maybe it's time we start talking about mandatory vasectomies at the age of 18" and a November 2019 tweet that said wearing the hijab was "badass." In January 2020, she came under additional criticism after posting a tweet that read "Heterosexual relationships are really violent. And the large majority are based on religion. Maybe it's time to have a conversation about their abolition." She later apologised for the tweet, stating that she had been attempting to start a conversation about femicide in Québec.

In June 2020, she announced she was stepping down from the presidency of the FFQ.

== Personal life ==
Bouchard grew up in Abitibi, Québec.
