= Suzanne Legault =

Canadian jurist

Information Commissioner of Canada
- In office June 2010 – February 2018
- Preceded by: Robert Marleau
- Succeeded by: Caroline Maynard

Suzanne Legault was the Information Commissioner of Canada from June 2010 to February 2018. Prior to her appointment, Legault was the Assistant Information Commissioner from 2007 to 2009 and held the position of interim Information Commissioner from June 2009 to June 2010.

== Education ==
In 1988, Legault graduated from McGill Law School with a bachelor's degree in civil and common law. She also went to the Osgoode Hall Law School to obtain an additional legal certificate in adjudication.

== Career ==
Legault began her career as a defence lawyer throughout the 1990s and was briefly a Crown attorney. In 1996, she continued her legal career with the Competition Bureau and later became a counsel for the Department of Justice.

From 2007 to 2009, Legault was the Assistant Information Commissioner of Canada. In June 2009, Legault was named interim Information Commissioner after the retirement of Robert Marleau. Almost a year after being named interim Information Commissioner, Legault was appointed as the Information Commissioner of Canada in June 2010.

Near the end of her seven year tenure, Legault declared that she was not seeking re-election as Information Commissioner when her position expired in June 2017. However, Legault's position was extended twice to February 2018 when the Canadian federal government could not find an immediate successor. Legault remained as Information Commissioner until the end of February 2018 after her replacement Caroline Maynard was announced.

== Awards and honours ==
Legault was awarded the 2016 Spencer Moore Award by the Canadian Committee for World Press Freedom.
