= Ruth Rose (educator) =

Ruth Rose (born 1944) is a Quebec educator and feminist.

The daughter of Arnold Marshall Rose and Caroline Baer, both American sociologists, she was educated at the University of California at Berkeley and the University of Chicago. Rose taught economics at the Université du Québec à Montréal from 1970, but is now retired. Her areas of interest include labour economics, income security, post-Keynesian economics, the Quebec economy and the relationship between women and the economy. Her research contributed to the development of daycare services, benefits for parents, policies in support of families and improved working conditions in Quebec.

Rose was awarded the Prix Idola Saint-Jean in 1999. She was named a Knight in the National Order of Quebec in 2011.

She married Michel Lizée.
