= Daniel Therrien =

8th Privacy Commissioner of Canada

8th Privacy Commissioner of Canada
- In office 5 June 2014 – 26 June 2022
- Preceded by: Chantal Bernier

Daniel Therrien is a Canadian lawyer and civil servant who was the privacy commissioner of Canada from June 5, 2014 to June 26, 2022.

== Education ==
Therrien holds a Bachelor of Arts and a law degree from the University of Ottawa. He was called to the Quebec bar in 1981.

== Career ==
Prior to his appointment as privacy commissioner, Therrien held various positions within the Canadian federal government. His last position before his appointment was as assistant deputy attorney general for the public safety, defence and immigration portfolio. He held that position from 2005 until his appointment in 2014.

== Privacy commissioner ==
Therrien was appointed as the privacy commissioner of Canada on June 5, 2014. The appointment was approved by the House of Commons in a 153–75 vote.
