= Caroline Maynard =

Information Commissioner of Canada
- Incumbent
- Assumed office March 1, 2018
- Preceded by: Suzanne Legault

Personal details
- Born: Saint-Hyacinthe, Quebec

Caroline Maynard is a Canadian lawyer and civil servant who was appointed as Information Commissioner of Canada in March 2018. Prior to that, she served in various positions (including that of Chief Executive Officer) with the Military Grievances External Review Committee of Canada between 2006 and 2018.

== Education and early career ==
Maynard holds a Bachelor of Laws degree from the Université de Sherbrooke. She was admitted to the Quebec Bar in 1994, and for a short while worked in private practice.

== Civil service ==
For over twenty years, Maynard was employed by various Canadian government agencies, including the Canada Revenue Agency and as legal counsel for the Royal Canadian Mounted Police External Review Committee (1998–2001) and then the Office of the Judge Advocate General (2001–2006). From 2006 to 2018, she worked for the Military Grievances External Review Committee and rose to the position of Interim Chairperson and Chief Executive Officer.

In 2018, Maynard was found to be best merited in an open process of applications for the position of Information Commissioner. She thus was nominated by the Prime Minister to the Parliament of Canada, which appointed her.
