= Micheline Dumont (historian) =

Canadian historian, lecturer and professor (born 1935)

Micheline Dumont CM CQ
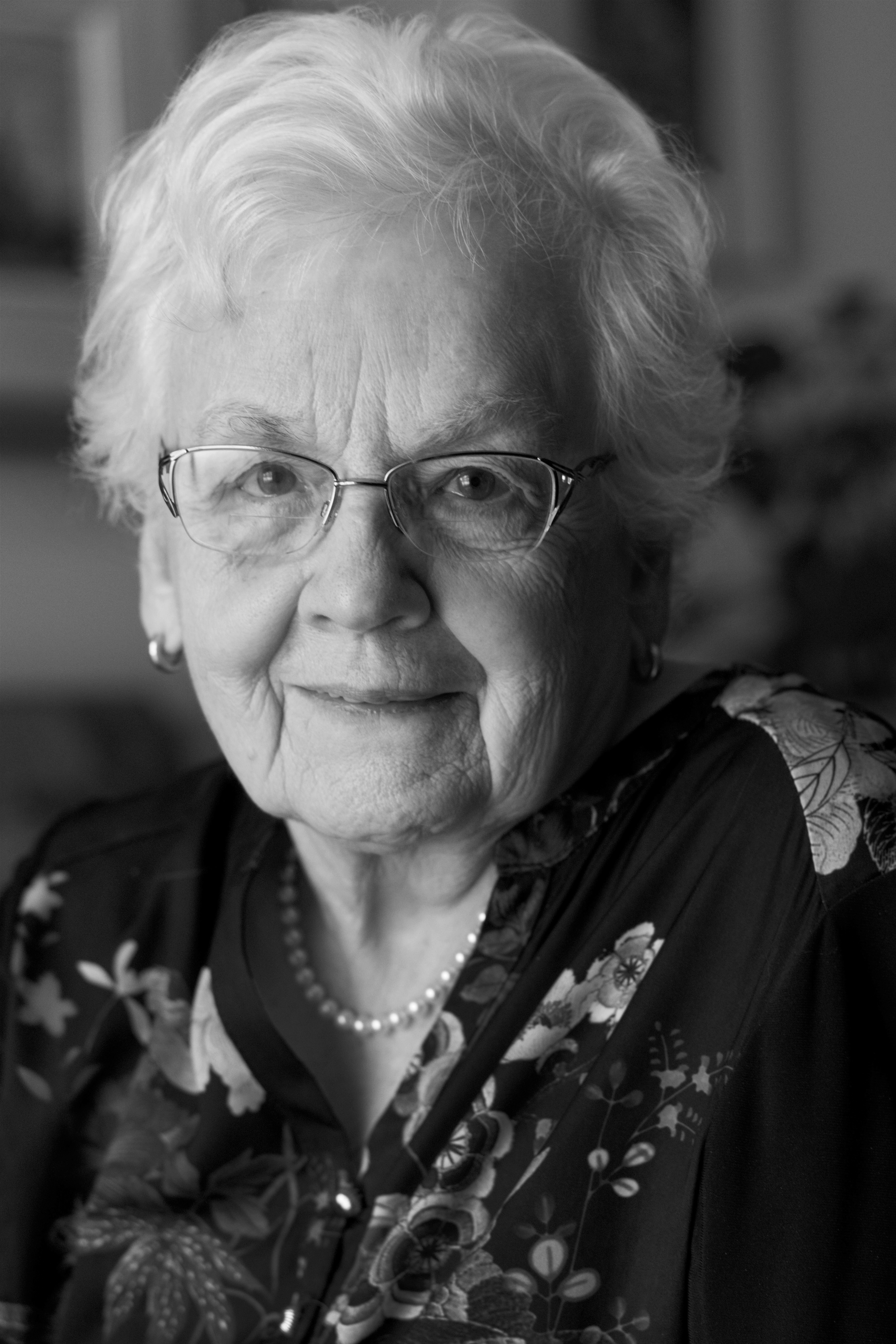
- Micheline Dumont (2019)
- Born: 1935 (age 90–91); Verdun, Quebec, Canada
- Education: Université de Montréal; Université Laval
- Occupations: historian, lecturer, professor
- Writing career
- Language: French
- Subject: History of women in Quebec
- Notable work: L'Histoire des femmes au Québec depuis quatre siècles
- Notable awards: Governor General's Awards; Prix Idola Saint-Jean

Micheline Dumont CM CQ (born 1935) is a Canadian historian, lecturer and professor. Her name also appears as Dumont-Johnson. She is a specialist in the history of women in Quebec. She is particularly known as the co-author, with Marie Lavigne, Jennifer Stoddart, and Michèle Stanton, of L'Histoire des femmes au Québec depuis quatre siècles, the first synthesis on the subject. Having taught at the Université de Sherbrooke since 1970, Dumont retired in 2000 with the title of professor emeritus.

== Early life and education ==
She was born in 1935 in Verdun, Quebec, a neighbourhood in Montreal. As a young woman, she studied with the Sisters of Saint Anne in Vaudreuil and Lachine. A literature graduate from the Université de Montréal, she continued in history at Université Laval.

== Career and research ==
After teaching in several Montreal colleges, she became a professor in the history department at the Université de Sherbrooke in 1970. She is one of the pioneers of women's history in Quebec.

A researcher for the Royal Commission on the Status of Women (1968), she has published several historical works and articles on the status of women in contemporary times in New France. Her specialization in women's history also led her to perfect her research on women teachers and nuns in Quebec. She submitted a thesis on Quebec women and the constitutional future to the Bélanger-Campeau Commission.

She is regularly invited to various media outlets for questions concerning women's history. Dumont was a commentator for the series Épopée en Amérique by Jacques Lacoursière and Gilles Carle, as well as for the documentary Traître ou patriote by Jacques Godbout and the show L'histoire à la une by Claude Charron. In addition, Dumont has collaborated with Nadia Fahmy-Eid and the Clio Collective. Dumont retired in 1999 and received the title of professor emeritus in 2000. The Micheline-Dumont fund is held by the University of Sherbrooke and contains documents relating to her career.

== Awards and honours ==
- 1993 - Member, Royal Society of Canada
- 2002 - Prix pour l'étude du genre of the Royal Society of Canada
- 2002 - Aequitas Prize for founders of the PÉPINES group
- 2004 - Literary Prize of the City of Sherbrooke, for the "Essays" category
- 2009 - Juge-Lemay Literary Prize
- 2010 - City of Sherbrooke Book Prize
- 2012 - Prix Idola Saint-Jean
- 2014 - Sherbrooke Historical Society Tribune Prize
- 2015 - Gérard-Parizeau Prize from HEC Montréal
- 2017 - Governor General's Awards in Commemoration of the Persons Case
- 2018 - Member, Order of Canada
- 2019 - Knight, National Order of Quebec
- 2023 - Medal, National Assembly of Quebec

== Selected works ==
- Laure Conan, Choix de textes choisis et présentés, 1960
- Apôtres ou Agitateurs. La France Missionnaire en Acadie, 1970
- Tradition culturelle et histoire politique de la femme au Canada; three essays, 1971
- L'Histoire apprivoisée, 1979
- Histoire des femmes au Québec depuis quatre siècles, 1982 (with Clio Collective)
- Maîtresses de maison, maîtresses d'école. Femmes, Familles et Éducation dans l'histoire du Québec, 1983 (with Nadia Fahmy-Eid)
- Le mouvement des femmes, hier et aujourd'hui, 1986
- Les Couventines. L'Éducation des filles au Québec dans les congrégations religieuses enseignantes, 1840-1960, 1986 (with Nadia Fahmy-Eid)
- Quebec Women: A History, 1987 (with Clio Collective)
- Histoire des femmes au Québec depuis quatre siècles, 1992 (with Clio Collective): (Second edition, reviewed, corrected and expanded)
- Les religieuses sont-elles féministes?, 1995
- Découvrir la mémoire des femmes : une historienne face à l'histoire des femmes, 2001
- La pensée féministe au Québec : anthologie, 1900-1985, 2003 (with Louise Toupin)
- Brève histoire des institutrices au Québec de la Nouvelle-France à nos jours, 2004, (with Andrée Dufour)
- Le féminisme québécois raconté à Camille (2008)
- Feminism à la Québécoise (2012)
- Pas d'histoire, les femmes!:réflexions d'une historienne indignée (2013)
- De si longues racines. L’histoire d’une historienne (2022) (autobiography)

=== Signed prefaces ===
- Augustine Prévost, L'éducation, hier et aujourd'hui, 1850-1985, 1986
- Huguette O'Neil, Yvette Rousseau : la réussite d'une vie, 2004
- Mylène Bigaouette et Marie-Eve Surprenant (dir.), Les femmes changent la lutte : au cœur du printemps québécois, 2013
- Daniel Raunet, Monique Bégin : entretiens, 2016
