= Privacy Commissioner of Canada =

Canadian government Privacy Agency

- Commissaire à la protection de la vie privée du Canada
- Incumbent; Philippe Dufresne since June 27, 2022
- Office of the Privacy Commissioner
- Abbreviation: OPC
- Reports to: Parliament of Canada
- Appointer: Governor in Council
- Term length: 7 years once renewable
- Constituting instrument: Privacy Act
- First holder: Inger Hansen
- Salary: $314,100 (Equal to a Judge of the Federal Court of Canada)
- Website: www.priv.gc.ca

Office of the Privacy Commissioner of Canada
- Commissariat à la protection de la vie privée du Canada

Agency overview
- Formed: 1977
- Headquarters: Gatineau, Quebec, Canada
- Employees: 257
- Annual budget: $39.7 million (2019)

The privacy commissioner of Canada (French: Commissaire à la protection de la vie privée du Canada) is a non-partisan ombudsman and officer of the Parliament of Canada. The commissioner investigates complaints regarding violations of the federal Privacy Act, which deals with personal information held by the Government of Canada or the Personal Information Protection and Electronic Documents Act (PIPEDA), which deals with personal information held in federally regulated private sector industries. The commissioner reports to Parliament.

Philippe Dufresne has served as the ninth and current privacy commissioner of Canada since he was appointed on June 27, 2022.

The privacy commissioner has the authority to audit, publish information about personal information-handling practices in the public and private sector, conduct research into privacy issues and promote awareness and understanding of privacy issues from the public.

Since 1983, the privacy commissioner has been a seven-year Governor in Council appointment made after consultation with the leaders of every political party in the Senate and House of Commons, and after the approval of both chambers. Prior to the Privacy Act of 1983, which lays out the present role and appointment process of the office, the appointment was made by the minister of justice on the advice of the chief commissioner of the Canadian Human Rights Commission.

The privacy commissioner reports to the House of Commons Standing Committee on Access to Information, Privacy and Ethics.

== List of privacy commissioners ==
There have been eight privacy commissioners since the office was established in 1977.

List of privacy commissioners of Canada
No.	Name	Term	Notes
1	Inger Hansen	July 1977 – June 30, 1983	
2	John Grace	July 1, 1983 – June 30, 1990	
3	Bruce Phillips	April 17, 1991 – August 31, 2000	
4	George Radwanski	September 1, 2000 – June 23, 2003	acting, September 1 – October 18, 2000; left role amidst a scandal over expenses
5	Robert Marleau	July 2, 2003 – November 30, 2003	acting
6	Jennifer Stoddart	December 1, 2003 – December 2, 2013	
7	Chantal Bernier	December 3, 2013 – June 2014	acting
8	Daniel Therrien	June 5, 2014 – June 26 2022	
9	Philippe Dufresne	June 27, 2022 – incumbent	

== See also ==
- Information and Privacy Commissioner of Ontario
- Parliament of Canada
