= Alexa Conradi =

Canadian activist

- Born: 1971 (age 54–55); United Kingdom
- Occupation: Activist

Alexa Conradi (born 1971) is a Canadian activist and former president of the Fédération des femmes du Québec (FFQ).

== Career ==
In 2009, she was named president of the Fédération des femmes du Québec, succeeding Michèle Asselin in the post, and stating that she wanted to fight the misconception that the struggle for gender equality in Québec was mostly over. She was re-elected FFQ president for a third mandate in May 2013.

As part of her presidency of the FFQ, she opposed the Quebec Charter of Values. In 2014, after high-profile sexual assault allegations leveled against CBC Radio presenter Jian Ghomeshi, she spoke publicly about her experience of having been sexually assaulted by an ex-partner.

In February 2015, she criticised Coalition Avenir Québec MNA André Spénard following a confrontation between the two at a parliamentary commission meeting studying Bill 28, stating that he had a regressive vision and that she "wasn't often shocked like this." Later that year, Conradi united with the heads of seven other women's organisations in Québec to condemn austerity politics by the government of Québec, stating that "elsewhere in the world, in England, in France, in Greece, austerity has led to major regression of women's rights."

After leaving the FFQ and suffering from burnout, she moved to Germany. In 2017 announced the publication of a book titled Les angles morts. The book was a finalist for the 2018 Prix du livre politique of the Salon international du livre de Québec.

== Personal life ==
Conradi was born in England in 1971 to a Canadian father of Norwegian origin and an anglophone Quebecker mother. In 2004, she earned a degree from the École des affaires publiques et communautaires (ÉAPC) at Concordia University. She holds a master's degree in Media Studies obtained from Concordia University. She was previously in a relationship with Québec solidaire politician Manon Massé for twelve years with whom she raised her two children.
