= Réjane Laberge-Colas =

Canadian judge

The Honourable Réjane Laberge-Colas

Judge of the Quebec Superior Court
- In office 21 February 1969 – 1994
- Appointed by: John Turner

Personal details
- Born: 8 October 1923 Montreal, Quebec, Canada
- Died: 9 August 2009 (aged 85) Magog, Quebec, Canada
- Spouse: Émile Colas (m. 1958)
- Education: Villa Maria; Collège Marguerite-Bourgeoys (BA); Faculté de droit, Université de Montréal (LL.L, cum laude)
- Occupation: Judge and lawyer
- Awards: Order of Canada (1997)

Réjane Laberge-Colas OC QC (8 October 1923 – 9 August 2009) was a judge of the Quebec Superior Court, sitting in Montreal, and the first woman to serve as a superior court judge in Canada. She was a founder and the first president of the Fédération des femmes du Québec (FFQ). Laberge-Colas was inducted to the Order of Canada in 1997.

== Legal career ==
After placing first in the 1952 Quebec bar exam, Laberge-Colas began her career as in-house counsel to Aluminium Secretariat Ltd, an affiliate of what is now Alcan. In 1957, she took a position as an articling student at Geoffrion et Prud'homme, a corporate law firm. (Note: Geoffrion et Prud'homme were counsel to the Aluminum Company in Quebec as of the early 1940s, so it is probable that Laberge-Colas obtained her position with the firm through connections in the aluminum industry. See Massell, David Perera (2011). Quebec Hydropolitics: The Peribonka Concessions of the Second World War. Montreal: McGill–Queen's University Press. p. 64. ISBN 978-0-7735-9097-7. OCLC 820839325.) She was named a Queen's Counsel in 1968.

Laberge-Colas practised at Geoffrion et Prud'homme until 1969, when she was appointed to the bench. She served as a judge of the Quebec Superior Court until 1994.

Among other professional activities, Laberge served in the family law section of Office de révision du Code civil du Québec in the late 1960s and on an extraordinary challenge committee in connection with NAFTA in 1994.

== Activism ==
In the mid-1960s, Laberge-Colas was a member of the Ligue des droits de l'homme du Quebec (Quebec Human Rights League), an organization which advocated for the Quebec Charter of Human Rights and Freedoms.

Along with Thérèse Casgrain and Monique Bégin, Laberge-Colas founded the Fédération des femmes du Québec (FFQ) in Montreal during a conference that ran from 23 to 24 April 1966. At the conference, Laberge-Colas was named the FFQ's first president. A number of members of the Ligue were also members of FFQ.

== Personal life ==
Laberge-Colas was born in Montreal to Xiste Laberge and Isabelle Lefebvre. She married Émile Colas, a lawyer, in 1958.

== Works ==
- Laberge-Colas, Réjane (1963). "L'incapacité de la femme mariée". La Revue du Barreau (in French). 23 (10): 572–576.

== Bibliography ==
- Backhouse, Constance (2017). Claire L'Heureux-Dubé: A Life. Vancouver: University of British Columbia Press. ISBN 978-0-7748-3632-6. OCLC 1019835638.
