= Rouhollah Zamzameh =

Iranian journalist (born 1979)

- Born: 1979 (age 46–47); Tehran, Iran
- Education: Islamic Azad University, Karaj Branch (BA)
- Years active: 1998–present

Rouhollah Zamzameh, known also as (Rola) is a social and cultural writer.He is an Iranian senior journalist at the European Parliament and the European Commission. and human rights activist. He began his media career in Iran in 1998 and, after migrating to Europe in 2020, continued in journalism, writing, and research in social and cultural fields.

== Early life ==
Zamzameh was born in Tehran, where he pursued his education and began his early professional activities in journalism and cultural analysis. In Iran, he became known as a critic of music and cinema and published articles in these fields.

== Career ==
He is a senior journalist and analyst in the fields of music and cinema. He was a member of the International Federation of Journalists (IFJ). He is a member of EnGaje Ensemble and Groupe d’Aide aux Journalistes Exilés.

He is a member of the AoIJ Association of Iranian Journalists (With the inauguration of the presidency of Mahmoud Ahmadinejad, the association faced systematic harassment, which culminated in its closure in August 2009.)

He collaborated with Iranian publications, including Cinema and Mehr weeklies.

He worked on Tanz o Caricature and Sor’at (as translation editor); Aroos, Ghalam-e Yaran monthlies; and the newspapers Doran, Iran, Sazandegi, and Arman Melli

=== Diplomacy ===
Following his migration to Belgium, Zamzameh was active in the field of international affairs and diplomacy, with contributions at the European Parliament, the European Commission, and the European Council.

=== Interviews and research ===
He conducted analytical interviews with Iranian and international political, social, and artistic figures, including: Nasrin Sotoudeh, Reza Deghati, and Professor Nazila Ghanea, Fariba Balouch, Manijeh Hekmat, Marilena Nardi (professor of the Academy of Fine Arts of Venice), and Professor Katherine Krizek.

=== Films and documentaries ===
- The Profession: Cartoonist (portrait of Javad Alizadeh)
- The Story of a Symphony (documentary trilogy About Majid Entezami symphonies)
- Ode to the Tree – To Abbas Kiarostami
- Notes of Azar- (about Azarnoush Sadr Salek)
- Director of the concert Sing This Season with Me, Isar Symphony, and Symphony of Peace with the Tehran Symphony Orchestra. Composer: Majid Entezami
- In the Palm of my Hand (director Jules Mathout)
- Hold on to Her (director Robin Vanbesin)

== Migration ==
In the late 2020s, Zamzameh migrated to Belgium. He continued his journalistic, cultural, and research work, contributing to media outlets such as: Brussels Morning.
