= John W. Grace =

- Born: John William Grace; 6 January 1927; Ottawa, Ontario, Canada
- Died: 5 February 2009 (aged 82); Ottawa, Ontario, Canada
- Education: St. Patrick's College; The Catholic University of America; University of Michigan
- Known for: First Privacy Commissioner of Canada
- Spouse: Ruth Herbert (m. 1954-2009)
- Children: 3 daughters, 3 sons

John William Grace (6 January 1927 – 5 February 2009) was the first Privacy Commissioner of Canada.

== Early life and education ==
He was born in Ottawa, Ontario and attended St. Patrick's High School there. His education continued in Ottawa at St. Patrick's College where he earned a Bachelor of Arts diploma and where he was close classmates with Douglas Roche and John Turner who became federal politicians. Grace then moved to Washington, D.C. where he attended The Catholic University of America. After receiving a Master of Arts there in 1952, he proceeded to Ann Arbor, Michigan where he earned a Doctor of Philosophy at the University of Michigan in 1958.

== Work career ==
In 1958, Grace returned to Canada and entered journalism, becoming a member of the Ottawa Journal's editorial board. He remained with that newspaper until its demise in 1980, two years after he became its chief editor and vice-president. Grace had directed the Journal's editorial policy since 1972, after being an associate editor since 1962. Between 1971 and 1977, Grace was also a member of the Canada Council, serving there for two terms. After the Ottawa Journal closed, Grace was appointed to the Canadian Radio-television and Telecommunications Commission as a full-time commissioner.

Grace served a seven-year term as the first Privacy Commissioner of Canada, starting in 1983. This Canadian federal agency is responsible for supervising the private and public management of personal information. In 1990, Prime Minister Brian Mulroney appointed Grace as the Information Commissioner of Canada, but by 1992 Grace confronted the Mulroney government regarding its refusal to release the results of government-funded polls regarding national unity. Grace remained Information Commissioner until 1998.

He was a part-time lecturer at the University of Ottawa where he was a member of its board of governors for four terms.

== Death ==
Grace died following a heart attack at his Ottawa home on 5 February 2009, aged 82.
