= Justin Brake =

Canadian journalist

Justin Brake is a Canadian journalist, press freedom advocate and Editor-in-Chief of The Independent in Newfoundland and Labrador. He has worked with digital news publication The Breach and Indigenous broadcaster APTN. While covering Indigenous-led protests in Labrador in 2016, which led to the occupation of a workers' camp at the Muskrat Falls hydroelectric project worksite, Brake was named on a court injunction after he followed land protectors on to the site and remained with them during their occupation. Facing civil and criminal charges, he won a landmark court case in the Newfoundland & Labrador Court of Appeal which established a new legal precedent for journalists in Canada. The charges against Brake were condemned by press-freedom groups and Brake's reporting won him multiple national press freedom awards.

== Early life and education ==
Brake was born in Newfoundland and raised in Saskatchewan and Ottawa. He is a settler who has publicly explored his potential Mi'kmaw ancestry. He graduated from Algonquin College's journalism program in 2003 and returned to Newfoundland in 2007 to study at Memorial University in St. John's. He now lives with his family in the Bay of Islands.

== Career ==
From 2012 to 2017, Brake was a journalist at The Independent based in Newfoundland and Labrador. In October 2016, he was arrested while reporting on water protectors who had forcibly entered Nalcor Energy's work site at Muskrat Falls known as the Lower Churchill Project. Brake was criminally charged criminally with mischief and disobeying a court order and with civil contempt proceedings in Newfoundland and Labrador Supreme Court, due to an injunction from the owners prohibiting trespass that names him, without mentioning him as a journalist.

=== Civil court case ===
The injunction was issued on October 16, 2016, and an ex parte contempt appearance order issued on October 24, 2016. At least one local rally was held in support of Brake demanding the charges be dropped. Brake fought the civil charges but lost. On March 15, 2017, Justice George Murphy of the Supreme Court of Newfoundland and Labrador wrote in his decision: “Mr. Brake’s status as a journalist was not a material fact and there was no obligation on Nalcor to bring that fact to the attention of the Court on their application for the Injunction Order or the Contempt Appearance Order.”

The case was appealed to the Court of Appeal of Newfoundland and Labrador, the province's highest court, on December 12, 2017. At the hearing, APTN executive director of news Pugliese testified that media should be present at conflicts involving indigenous peoples, with reference to the calls to action of Canada's Truth and Reconciliation Commission. Justice Derek Green's March 28, 2019 decision stated “The evidence from APTN, which I accept, is that Aboriginal communities have been historically under-represented in the Canadian media.” The decision referenced both the Charter rights to free expression for journalists and stated the need for reconciliation “places a heightened importance on ensuring that independently-reported information about (A)boriginal issues, including (A)boriginal protests, is available to the extent possible.” Nalcour did not appeal the case to the Supreme Court of Canada. The case established the legal precedent preventing the arbitrary use of injunctions against journalists and recognizes the important role journalists have in covering protests and Indigenous issues in Canada.

=== Criminal charges ===
In September 2019, lawyers for The Crown filed criminal charges of mischief and unlawfully disobeying an order of the court against Brake. In September Brake filed a charter challenge to ask for a stay of proceedings, and Brake's lawyer Geoff Budden said he would be arguing the charges are an "abuse of process". In November 2019 the Crown decided to drop the charge against Brake of unlawfully disobeying an order of the court, but decided to pursue a charge of mischief over $5,000. Ultimately they dropped those charges in March 2020 as they were unlikely to win.

Brake was the first Canadian journalist to face both criminal and civil charges.

Legal experts and press freedom groups such as Canadian Journalists for Free Expression, the Canadian Association of Journalists stated that if the charges were upheld it would give precedence to property rights over media rights as defined in case law and the Charter of Rights and Freedoms. The case drew international attention from the Fahmy Foundation, Reporters without Borders, and was cited as a concern by the Press Freedom Index. The 29-page unanimous decision by the Court of Appeal of Newfoundland and Labrador, established an important legal precedent across Canada protecting the legal rights of media against use of injunctions.

Brake was the recipient of the 20th annual Press Freedom Award, awarded annually by the Canadian Committee for World Press Freedom, the 2018 PEN Canada/Ken Filkow Prize for freedom of expression, and co-recipient, with Indigenous journalist Karyn Pugliese, of the 2019 Elias Boudinot Free Press Award, issued by the Native American Journalists Association.

In 2017, Brake joined APTN News as a reporter, and works in their Ottawa bureau.
