= Jennifer Stoddart =

6th Privacy Commissioner of Canada

Jennifer Stoddart CQ

6th Privacy Commissioner of Canada
- In office December 1, 2003 – December 2013
- Governor-General: Adrienne Clarkson
- Prime Minister: Jean Chrétien
- Preceded by: Robert Marleau
- Succeeded by: Chantal Bernier

Personal details
- Born: 1949 (age 76–77) Toronto, Ontario, Canada

Jennifer Stoddart CQ (born 1949) was the sixth Privacy Commissioner of Canada.

== Early life and education ==
Stoddart was born in 1949 in Toronto. In 1967 she graduated from Neuchâtel Junior College in Switzerland. Fluent in five languages, she studied Quebec social history and received a Master of Arts in history from the Université du Québec à Montréal. In 1980 she received a licence in civil law from McGill University; she was admitted to the bar in 1981. She is married to an architect who teaches urban planning; they have two grown sons.

== Career ==
As a lawyer she worked to modernize regulations and remove barriers to employment based on gender or cultural differences. She headed the Quebec Commission on Access to Information and held senior positions at the Quebec Human Rights and Youth Rights Commission, the Canadian Human Rights Commission and the Canadian Advisory Council on the Status of Women.

On December 1, 2003, Stoddart was appointed Canada's Privacy Commissioner by the Governor in Council for a seven-year term. In December 2010, she was reappointed for a three-year term, which ended in December 2013.

In her role as commissioner she gave an annual report to Parliament about privacy trends and results of investigations, including privacy audits of government departments. Her 2013 report drew attention to privacy problems with the Canada Revenue Agency. She represented Canada at the annual International Conference on Privacy and Personal Data Protection.

In November 2005, a journalist showed Stoddart her own telecommunication-data for the past few months - the ones from her private connection as well as those from the blackberry-systems provided by the government - which he had bought by an online data broker for about $200.

In 2008, she drew international headlines when she announced an investigation into the privacy policies of Facebook, which resulted in the social media site instituting privacy protections for its users.

Stoddart has been active in the Canadian Bar Association and the Canadian Institute for the Administration of Justice. She also serves as one of the board members on the social purpose corporation, Purism, which makes security-focused, Debian GNU/Linux based laptops & tablets.

== Honours ==
Jennifer Stoddart received a Doctor of Laws, honoris causa (LLD), at McGill University’s fall convocation ceremonies on Tuesday, November 10, 2015. She was made a Knight of the National Order of Quebec in 2020.

== See also ==
- Ann Cavoukian (IPC of Ontario)
- Hugo Teufel III (Chief Privacy Officer, DHS)
- Jacques Saint-Laurent (Chair, Commission d'accès à l'information du Québec)
