= The Independent (Newfoundland) =

Online newspaper in Newfoundland and Labrador

The Independent (Nfld and Lbdr)
- Type: Online newspaper
- Editor: Justin Brake
- Founded: 2001
- Political alignment: Left-Wing
- Headquarters: St. John's, Newfoundland and Labrador
- Website: theindependent.ca

The Independent is a digital news publication that covers stories and issues in Newfoundland and Labrador. The newspaper, a weekly print publication, was founded in 2001 and ceased publishing in 2008. The online version was launched in February 2011.

== Organization and perception ==
The Independent is edited by Justin Brake; it was previously operated by Drew Brown.

In 2012, author and academic Maura Hanrahan published a paper in Native Studies Review that stated "The Independent is considered the most progressive newspaper in the province [of Newfoundland and Labrador]"

== History ==
The Independent was a weekly print newspaper that switched to online.

Reporter and editor Justin Brake was arrested while covering the Muskrat Falls protests in 2016, prompting condemnation from Canadian Journalists for Free Expression and the Canadian Association of Journalists in 2017. Brake's reporting won press freedom awards in 2018 and 2019. All charges were dismissed in 2019.

== See also ==
- List of newspapers in Canada
