= Seyed Ali Miraee =

Iranian cartoonist and illustrator

Ali Miraee
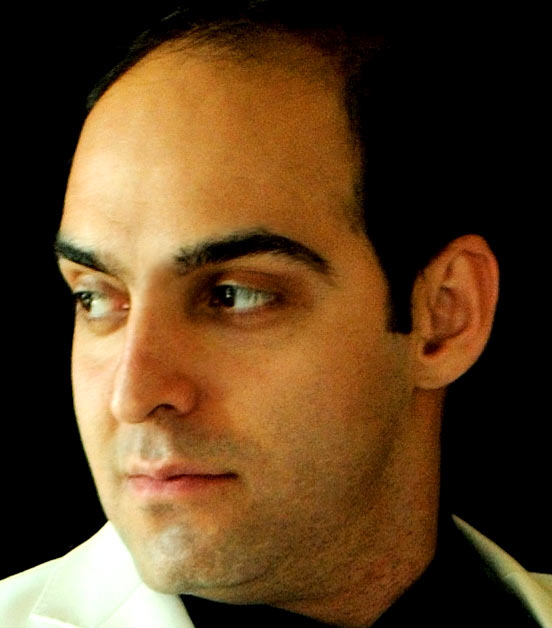
- Born: 18 July 1979 (age 47) Tehran, Iran
- Areas: Cartoonist, illustrator, designer
- Notable works: Anti-communism
- Awards: full list

Ali Miraee (born Seyed Ali Miraee; in 18 July 1979) is an Iranian cartoonist and illustrator for economic, political, cultural, and professional newspapers, magazines and Books.

He is particularly known for his work for the Shargh daily, Etemad newspaper and Tanz-o-Caricature magazine.

== Career ==
Ali Miraee started his artistic activity with the "Humor & Caricature Monthly" and won his first prestigious international award in 1995, from the second Tehran International Cartoon Biennial. What distinguishes him from other cartoonists is his mastery of different categories of cartoons. He has received world-renowned awards in various branches of cartoons, such as portrait caricature, comic strip, editorial cartoon and black cartoon in from Romania, Canada, South Korea, Poland, Italy, Belgium, Czech, Colombia, China, Turkey, Montenegro, Cyprus, Greece, Brazil, Mexico, Turkey, Serbia, etc. Although most of his specialties is funny cartoon.

The subjects of Ali Miraee's cartoons also reflect his vision and judgment of the world around him, which has made him an artist with a unique vision. Many of his cartoons are about religion and superstition, and this is significant given that he lives in a country with religious authority.

== Most important international awards ==
- Amnesty International Flanders Award, Olense Kartoenale (Belgium, 2024)
- First Prize, 23rd World Press Freedom international Editorial Cartoon Competition (Canada, 2023)
- First Prize (Thematic Category), International Humor Exhibition of Piracicaba (Brazil, 2021)
- Grand Prix, 44th Satyrykon International Festival, Legnica (Poland, 2021)
- Grand Prix, 42nd Satyrykon International Festival, Legnica (Poland, 2019)
- Gold Prize, Sicaco International Cartoon Contest (Korea, 2016)
- Third prize, International Cartoon Contest Ciudad de las Ideas (conference) (Mexico, 2015)
- Award of Excellence, 12th World Press Freedom International Editorial Cartoon Competition (Canada, 2012)
- Second Prize, İzmir Metropolitan Municipality International Cartoon Contest (Turkey, 2014)
- Grand Prize, 5th HumoDeva International Cartoon Contest (Romania, 2005; results announced 2006)

== Judgment ==
- Member of Jury of the 45th Satyrykon International Festival (Poland, 2025)
- Member of Jury of the 45th Satyrykon International Festival (Poland, 2022)
- Member of Jury of the 13th International Tourism Cartoon Competition (Turkey, 2021)
- Member of Jury of the 43rd Satyrykon International Festival (Poland, 2020)[20]
- Member of Jury of the 8th International Cartoon Contest Ciudad de las Ideas (México, 2016)
- Member of Jury of the First Nishkhat International Cartoon Contest (Iran, 2017)

== Exhibitions ==
- Parallel Exhibition hall International Piracicaba humor (Brazil, 2015) (Brazil, 2015)
- Solo exhibition in Iranian House of Cartoon (Tehran, 2016)
- Exhibition in honor of the William Shakespeare by 50 Brazilian and foreign top artists invited in gallery 9 of Engenho Central de Piracicaba (Brazil, 2016)
- Solo Exhibition in Ring Gallery in Legnica City (Poland, 2020)

== Books ==
- "Best of Ali Miraee" published by Crisan Publishing House (Romania, 2006)
- "Unemployment Insurance" Published by Social Security Organization Research Institute (Iran, 2017)

== Anti-communism ==
Miraee's work Communists was entered and received the Grand Prix from the International Jury Satyrykon in 2019. The work depicts the faces of dictators Joseph Stalin and Kim Jong-Un, positioned so that Stalin's moustache becomes Kim Jong-Un's hair. Professor Eugeniusz Skorwider of the University of Arts in Poznań praised the work, saying: "...it really is an important warning that evil is still going on, it results from one another. Apart from this drawing, you simply can not be indifferent." This sentiment was echoed by Gregory Szczepaniak, the organizer of Satyrykon: "The work is great also because of its versatility. His message will be clear in every corner of the world".
