= Information Commissioner of Canada =

- Commissaire à l'information du Canada

Department overview
- Formed: 1983
- Jurisdiction: Government of Canada
- Headquarters: 30 Victoria Street Gatineau, Quebec K1A 1H3, Canada
- Employees: 93
- Annual budget: 13,488,970
- Parent department: Parliament of Canada
- Website: www.oic-ci.gc.ca

The Information Commissioner of Canada is an independent ombudsman and an officer of parliament of Canada who reports directly to the House of Commons of Canada and the Senate of Canada.

The commissioner's work is supported by the Office of the Information Commissioner, which was established in 1983 under the Access to Information Act (ATIA) – Canada's freedom of information legislation. The office assists individuals and organizations who believe that federal institutions have not respected their rights under the ATIA. More specifically, the Office of the Information Commissioner:

- carries out investigations and dispute-resolution efforts to resolve complaints
- monitors federal institutions’ performances under the ATIA
- represents the commissioner in court cases, and provides legal advice on investigations and legislative matters

The information commissioner provides arm's-length oversight of the federal government's access to information practices. The commissioner encourages and assists federal institutions to adopt approaches to information-sharing that meet the objectives of the ATIA, and advocates for greater access to information in Canada.

Whenever possible, the commissioner relies on persuasion to solve disputes, asking for a federal court review only if an individual has been improperly denied access and a negotiated solution has proved impossible.

Caroline Maynard is the current information commissioner, appointed, for a seven-year term, on March 1, 2018.

== Information commissioners of Canada ==
There have been six information commissioners since the office was established in 1983. They hold office for seven-year terms (Access to Information Act, s. 54).

- Caroline Maynard (March 2018 – present)
- Suzanne Legault (2010 – February 2018)
- Suzanne Legault (2009-2010 – acting)
- Robert Marleau (2007-2009 – retired)
- John Mercer Reid (1998 – 2006)
- John W. Grace (1990 – 1998)
- Inger Hansen (1983 – 1990)

== See also ==
- Coordination of Access to Information Requests System
