= The Local (magazine) =

Digital Magazine

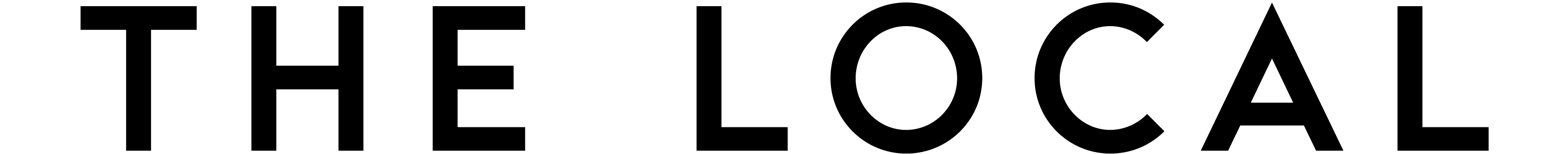
- Type: News Website
- Format: Online Newspaper
- Founded: 2019
- Headquarters: Toronto, Ontario, Canada
- ISSN: 2817-4720
- Website: thelocal.to

The Local is a Toronto-based general interest online magazine covering urban health and social issues. It was founded in 2019 as a not-for-profit organization, with Tai Huynh, Nicholas Hune-Brown, Jen Recknagel and Craig Madho as its founding editorial team. The Local publishes mostly long-form features, investigations and essays on a quarterly basis. From 2017 to 2019, The Local was a hyper-local storytelling project incubated at UHN OpenLab, a design and innovation studio at the University Health Network.

The Local is known for blending human-interest stories with data journalism, most notably during the COVID-19 pandemic when it published five issues dedicated to exploring the pandemic's impact on Toronto communities.

In 2021, The Local began tracking and reporting COVID-19 outbreaks in schools. They maintained a regularly updated data blog called the School Tracker to inform parents of the relative COVID risk in various schools throughout the GTA. On January 1, 2022, in response to this emerging data gap, The Local launched the RAT Tracker, a portal where parents could report the results of their children's rapid antigen tests (RAT). Using this data, they would compile COVID cases on a school level in Toronto in order to equip parents, students, and education staff with the information they need to be safe when returning to school.

The Local is a member of Press Forward, a collection of independent Canadian publications dedicated to unifying, elevating, and advocating for independent media organizations and working towards strengthening innovation, inclusivity and diversity in media across Canada.

== Awards ==
On May 3, 2022, The Local's pandemic coverage of Ontario's Peel region was won the 2022 World Press Freedom Award. The award recognizes Fatima Syed's groundbreaking reporting in her three feature articles, “You Can’t Stop the Spread of the Virus if You Don’t Stop it in Peel,” “The Chaotic Race to Vaccinate Peel,” and “We Had to Save Ourselves.” The award was presented to both Fatima Syed and The Local's Editor-in-Chief, Tai Huynh.

On June 12, 2025, The Local received the CJF Jackman Award for Excellence in Journalism (small) for its groundbreaking neighbourhood-level analysis of life expectancy in Toronto published in their issue "Divided City". The award is named after Dr. Eric Jackman and honours news organizations that embrace journalistic excellence — originality, courage, independence, accuracy, social responsibility, accountability and diversity — resulting in a positive impact on the communities they serve.

Award	Date	Category	Result	Ref.
Digital Publishing Award	2020	Best Feature Article: Short	gold	
Digital Publishing Award	2020	Best Online Video: Short	silver	
Digital Publishing Award	2020	General Excellence in Digital Publishing	Nominated	
Digital Publishing Award	2020	Best Feature Article	Nominated	
Digital Publishing Award	2021	Best News Coverage (Community Publication)	silver	
Digital Publishing Award	2021	Best Feature Article (Short)	silver	
Digital Publishing Award	2021	Best Feature Article (Long)	gold	
Digital Publishing Award	2021	General Excellence in Digital Publishing: Small	gold	
Digital Publishing Award	2022	Best News Coverage (Community Publication)	gold	
Digital Publishing Award	2022	Best Feature Article	Nominated	
Digital Publishing Award	2022	Best Feature Article (Short)	Nominated	
Digital Publishing Award	2022	Innovation in Digital Storytelling	Nominated	
Digital Publishing Award	2022	Emerging Excellence Award (Inori Roy)	Nominated	
Digital Publishing Award	2022	General Excellence in Digital Publishing: Small	gold	
Digital Publishing Award	2023	Best News Coverage (Community Publication)	silver	
Digital Publishing Award	2023	General Excellence in Digital Publishing: Small	gold	
Digital Publishing Award	2024	Best Digital Editorial Package (Small)	silver	
Digital Publishing Award	2024	Best Data Journalism	Nominated	
Digital Publishing Award	2024	Best News Coverage (Community Publication)	gold	
Digital Publishing Award	2024	Best Digital Design	Nominated	
Digital Publishing Award	2024	General Excellence in Digital Publishing (Small Publication)	Nominated	
Digital Publishing Award	2025	Best Data Journalism	Nominated	
Digital Publishing Award	2025	Best News Coverage	silver	
Digital Publishing Award	2025	Best Feature (Long)	gold	
Digital Publishing Award	2025	Best Photo Storytelling	Nominated	
Digital Publishing Award	2025	Best Arts & Culture Storytelling	Nominated	
Digital Publishing Award	2025	General Excellence in Digital Publishing (Small Publication)	gold	
National Magazine Awards	2021	Long-Form Feature Writing	Nominated	
National Magazine Awards	2021	Portrait Photography	Nominated	
National Magazine Awards	2022	Short Feature	silver	
National Magazine Awards	2022	Editor Grand Prix	gold	
National Magazine Awards	2022	Issue Grand Prix	Nominated	
National Magazine Awards	2023	Best Feature	Nominated	
National Magazine Awards	2023	Long-Form Feature Writing	Nominated	
National Magazine Awards	2023	Best Editorial Package	Nominated	
National Magazine Awards	2024	Feature Writing	Nominated	
National Magazine Awards	2024	Profile	Nominated	
National Magazine Awards	2024	Photo Essay & Photojournalism	gold	
National Magazine Awards	2024	Editorial Package	Nominated	
National Magazine Awards	2024	Best Emerging Writer	Nominated	
National Magazine Awards	2025	Long-Form Feature Writing: 6000+	Nominated	
National Magazine Awards	2025	Long-Form Feature Writing	Nominated	
National Magazine Awards	2025	Feature Writing	gold	
National Magazine Awards	2025	Investigative Reporting	Nominated	
National Magazine Awards	2025	Illustrations	silver	
National Magazine Awards	2025	Photo Essay & Photojournalism	gold	
National Magazine Awards	2025	Editorial Package	Nominated	
National Magazine Awards	2025	Editor Grand Prix	gold	
Canadian Association of Journalists Awards	2024	Community Written	gold	
Canadian Association of Journalists Awards	2021	Portrait Photography	gold	
