= Association Québécoise des Organismes de Coopération Internationale =

Association Auébécoise des Organismes de Coopération Internatioanale
- Abbreviation: AQOCI
- Formation: 1976
- Type: Non-Governmental Organization
- Purpose: Coordination on other NGOs
- Headquarters: 1001 Sherbroke Road, Suite 540, Montreal, Quebec, H2L1L3
- Location: Montreal, Canada
- Members: 71 member organizations (2025)
- Staff: 400 staff, 500 overseas cooperants (1986-87)
- Volunteers: 10,000 (1986-87)
- Website: https://aqoci.qc.ca/

The Association québécoise des organismes de coopération internationale (AQOCI, French for Quebec Association of International Cooperation Organizations) is a network that coordinates non-governmental organizations based in Quebec. It promotes the work of its member organizations to influence federal and provincial policies concerning international development.

== History ==
The AQOCI was founded in May 1976, based on a conference in December 1975 to create an umbrella organization for Quebec-based international organizations.

In 2015, the ACOQI participated in a campaign to petition the federal government to take a leading role in addressing inequality, human rights and universality principles. The Millennium Development Goals were replaced in 2015 by the Sustainable development goals, which will be completed in 2030 and consists of 17 goals for sustainable development.

In December 2025, the Ministry of International Affairs and La Francophonie was unable to fully fund Québec sans frontières (QSF), a solidarity program for international organizations in Quebec, due to budget cuts which impacted several AQOCI members. The AQOCI leadership released a statement criticizing this decision, and met with the Quebec International Affairs Minister Christopher Skeete on January 8 of 2026.

In February 2026, the AQOCI submitted a policy brief to the Ministry of International Affairs and La Francophonie, which advanced three recommendations:

1. Increase funding to the Ministry of International Affairs and La Francophonie, as international development would benefit the Quebec economy and internal standing.
2. Increase support for the QSF to help Quebec youth develop useful skills.
3. Increase support for the International Climate Cooperation program to ensure Quebec's role in combating climate change.

== Activism ==
Climate Change

In 2018, the AQOCI and Climate Action Network Canada held a public conference on climate change which focused on youth engagement.

Haiti

The AQOCI is a member of the Consultation for Haiti, a group of eleven NGOs that promotes human rights and solidarity in Haiti.

On May 8, 2024, the AQOCI, Cooperation Canada, and Consultation for Haiti published an open letter to Prime Minister Justin Trudeau about three possible resolutions to the 2024 Haitian Jailbreak, which was co-signed by thirty Canadian and nine Haitian NGOs. It advocated for the support of the Haitian Presidential Transitional Council, partnering with the United States to support the Haitian police and military, and providing humanitarian aid to alleviate food insecurity.

== Publications ==
Since 2012, the AQOCI has published press releases about their recent activities. Starting in 2018, the AQOCI has published annual reports about their activities for the year. The AQOCI newsletter, News in International cooperation, is a subscription based publication for AQOCI members.

The AQOCI Youtube channel hosts the organization's videos and podcasts.

Since 2015, the ACOQI has commissioned artists to create comic strips for its International Development Week. In 2015, these comics were: Inégalités by Cathon and Alexandre Rousseau, Égalité femmes-hommes by Francis Desharnais, Changements climatique by Michel Hellman, SMNE by Samuel Cantin, and Paix by Richard Suicide. These comics were accompanied by fact sheets to provide additional information about comic's message. Stand Up for a Just World was written by Nancy Roberge for the 2026 International Development Week, and tells the story of a girl who advocates for social justice.

== Organizations and programs ==
=== Quebec Collective of Feminisms in Dialogue (QCFD) ===
A Francophone committee on women and gender equality. The CQFD publishes a magazine about feminist, de-colonial and women's rights news.

=== Community of Practice in Environment (CoP) ===
A community of AQOCI members that works to increase environmental knowledge and promote collective action to combat climate change.

=== Youth Roundtable on International Solidarity (TCJSI) ===
A forum for young people to participate in international solidarity.

=== Quebec Days of International Solidarity (JQSI) ===
A 10-day annual meeting in Autumn between civil society groups to address major global challenges, which focuses on engaging the Quebec public. "Standing Up for a Just World", the most recent event, is themed around the climate crisis, wars, human rights setbacks and the disengagement from international aid. Each event is themed around a specific topic:

- 1997: North and South American solidarity
- 1998: Human rights and development
- 1999: Women's rights advocacy
- 2000: Promoting peace and non-violence
- 2001: Responsible consumption
- 2002: International conflict
- 2003: Water conservation
- 2004: Solidarity against militarism
- 2005/2006: Poverty eradication
- 2007: Environmental conservation
- 2008: Food sovereignty
- 2009: Climate justice
- 2010: Rethinking development
- 2011: Civic engagement
- 2012: Economic fairness
- 2013: Open dialogue on multiple topics
- 2014: Youth engagement and future speculation
- 2015: Women's rights

International Development Week (IDW)

An annual weekly event in February to highlight the work of Canadian internal organizations and their partners in the global south. Starting in 1991, every IDW has been focused on specific global issue:

- 2006: Poverty eradication
- 2007: Gender equality, poverty and education
- 2008: Education
- 2009: Poverty eradication
- 2010: Youth engagement
- 2011: Canadian solidarity
- 2012: International solidarity
- 2013: Civic involvement
- 2014: Volunteer cooperation
- 2016: Refugee Crises
- 2017: Women's rights

== Membership ==
As of 2025, the AQOCI has 71 member organizations that operate in 86 countries.

The first three members of the AQOCI were Carrefour Tiers-Monde, Développement et Paix, and Entraide missionnaire. In 1978, the AQOCI had 10 member organizations. The Carrefour Canadien International de Montreal, Centre de Solidarité d'Alma, and Centre de solidarité de Trois-Rivières joined the AQOCI in 1982. By 1986, it has a total of 39 members.

Current membership
Organization	Location
Action-Haiti	807 Bowen street, Magog
International Aid for Children	150 Grant Street, Longeuil
Alternative Life-Social Awakening	518 Oblats Avenue, Quebec City
Alternatives	3720 Park Avenue, Montreal
Architecture Without Borders	420 McGill Street, Montreal
Gatineau-world friendship	156 l'Orée-des-bois street, Gatineau
International Association for Business-NGO Partnership, Canada Chapter	369 la Couronne street, Quebec City
Lawyers without borders Canada	686 Grande Allée East, Quebec City
Quebec Association for the Advancement of the United Nations	473 Cannes street, Gatineau
International bureau for Children's Rights	805 Villeray street, Montreal
Crossroads for Education in International Solidarity Quebec	435 King street, Quebec City
Philanthropic Caravan	942 Ste Geneviève street, Trois-Rivières
Carrefour International	3000 Omer-Lavallée street, Montreal
CECI	3000 Omer-Lavallée street, Montreal
Crossroads of International Solidarity	165 Moore Street, Sherbrooke
Center for Adapted Communication	582 Des Tilleuls Street, Sherbrooke
Corcovado International Solidarity Cetner	83 Gamble Street west, Rouyn-Noranda
International Friendship and Solidarity Center of the Appalachian Region	37 Notre-Dame Street West, Thetford Mines
International Solidarity Centre of Sagenay-Lac-Saint-Jean	27 Saint-Joseph Street, Alma
International Workers Solidarity Centre	565 Crémazie Street East, Montreal
Interdisciplinary Center for International Development Health	150 Place Charles-Lemoyne
TARGETS	60 l'Évêché Street East, Rimouski
Clowns Without Borders	105 Ontario Street, Montreal
International Health Collaboration	1001 Canardière road, Quebec City
Solidarity Committee Trois-Rivières	942 Sainte Geneviève Street, Trois-Rivières
Committee for Human Rights in Latin America	47508 Plateau, Montreal
CPA Without Borders	5 Place Ville Marie, Montreal
Lanaudière Regional Committee for Education for International Development	101 Douglas Street, Joliette
Cuso International	22541 Monkland, Montreal
DESI	2330 Notre-Dame West, Montreal
North-South Cycling	9717 8th Avenue, Montreal
Desjardins International Development	150 des Commandeurs, Levis
Development and Peace Caritas Canada	1425 René-Lévesque Boulevard West, Montreal
Quebec School for Intrepreneurs	505 René-Lévesque Boulevard West, Montreal
Educonnexion	6365 Saint-Vallier Street East, Montreal
International Education	N/A
Equitas	666 Sherbroke Street West, Montreal
Roncalli Internation Foundation	9001 Acadie Boulevard, Montreal
EUMC	1404 Scott Street, Ottawa
Mothers of the World Foundation for Health	208 Club-Marin Street
Paul-Gérin Lajoie Foundation	465 Saint-Jean Street
Foundation for the Children of Equador	4388 Saint Denis Street, Montreal
Southern Solidarity Fund	620 Sir-Wilfrid Laurier Bulevard
International Cooperation Group of the University of sherbroke	2500 University Bulevard, Sherbrooke
Humanity & Inclusion	50 Sainte-Catherine Street West, Montreal
Nurses Without Borders	2401 Lafayette Bulevard, Longeuil
Engineers without Borders	8440 Saint-Laurent Bulevard, Montreal
Inter Pares	221 Laurier Avenue East, Ottawa
IRIS Mundial	1885 Daniel-Johnson Boulevard, Laval
L'amie International Aid for Children	840 Raoul-Jobin Street, Quebec City
Katalizo	2159 Gauthier Street, Montreal
The Friends of Saint-Camille	381 Raoul Saint-Colombian Road, Quebec City
Doctors of the World	560 Crémazie Boulevard, Montreal
The Artisans of International Peace	2-310 Sainte-Rose Boulevard, Laval
Sea and World	340 St-Augustine Street, Montreal
Canadian partners for International Health	123 Organisations street, Montreal
Mission Inclusion	130 l'Épée Avenue, Montreal
Oxfam-Quebec	2330 Notre-Dame Street West, Montreal
Public Relations without borders	1155 Metcalfe Street, Montreal
Partnership for Community Development	1855 Rachel Street East, Montreal
Psycoeducation without Borders	9137 Basile-Routhier Street, Montreal
SOCODEVI	850 Ernest-Gagon Avenue, Quebec City
World Health	2180 Ste-Foy Street, Quebec City
International Water Secretariate	911 Jean Talon Street East, Montreal
North-South Solidarity of the Bois Francs	59 Monfette Street, Victoriaville
South Solidarity	9267 Sainte-Foy Branch, Quebec City
Land Without Borders	399 Conseillers Street, La Praire
SUCO	7250 Clark Street, Montreal
Village World	4187 Côte de Cap-Rouge, Quebec
UPA International Development	555 Roland-Therrien Blvd, Longueuil
All the Children of the Other World	4-640 Langlois Street, Terrebonne

== Organization ==
All members of the AQOCI follow polices in eight core documents, which outline the objectives and principles of the Association. The Charter of Principles for Inclusive Development, Charter of Principles on Human Rights and Development, and Declaration of Quebec promote equitable international development based on human rights and solidarity, and promote the civic engagement of Quebec citizens in international organizations. The Policy on Women's Rights and Gender Equality and Harassment Policy promotes women's rights and gender equality based on feminist principles and protects all employees from sexual or psychological harassment. The Environmental Policy commits the Association to promoting sustainable practices and environmental practices using ecological responsibility.

In January off 2017, the ACOQI adopted Global Citizenship Education (GCE) into its governing ideology. GCE is an education-based approach to global citizenship that promotes human rights and social justice, and an understanding of the structural causes of inequality. Global Citizenship refers to responsibility to the international community, which emphasizes diversity, awareness and knowledge needed to address global inequalities.

The AQOCI is run by a Secretariat and Board of Directors. The Secretariat is responsible for implementing the AQOCIs projects, and currently has 12 members.

Current Secretariat
Name	Position
Michèle Asselin	General Manager
Katina Binette	Program Officer, Training and Québec Sans Frontières
Nancy Burrows	Program Officer, Global Citizen Education
Denis Coté	Policy Analyist
Mounia Chadi	Program Officer, Women's Rights and Gender Equality
Michele Defour	Financial Management and Accounting Manager
Katrie Gagné	Communications Manager
Sara Germain	Digital Communications Officer
Fabiola Mella	Administrative assistant
Caterina Milani	Program Officer, Global Citizenship Education and Mobilization
Stéphie-Rose Nyot Nyot	Community Manager
Martín Portocarrero Incio	Program officer, Environment and Youth Programs

The ten members of the board of directors are elected at the AQOCI annual general meeting, and are responsible for managing the Association's affairs and giving statements about its operation. The current general manager of the AQOCI is Michèle Asselin.

Current Board of Directors
Name	Position	Organization
Michèle Asselin	General manager	AQOCI
Saliou Coundoul	Administrator	Carrefour International
Valérie Delage	Co-chair	Trois-Revières Solidarity Committee
Mollie Dujardin	Secretary	
Romeo Essou	Administrator	Paul Gérin-Lajoie Foundation
Geneviève Gauthier	Administrator	
Hélène Gobeil	Administrator	Caritas Canada
Océane Leroux-Maurais	Administrator	Katalizo
Sabrina Ostré	Treasurer	Saguenay-Lac-Saint-Jean International Solidarity Centre
Laurent St-Pierre	Co-president	
