= Fédération des femmes du Québec =

Canadian feminist organization

Quebec Women's Federation
- Fédération des femmes du Québec
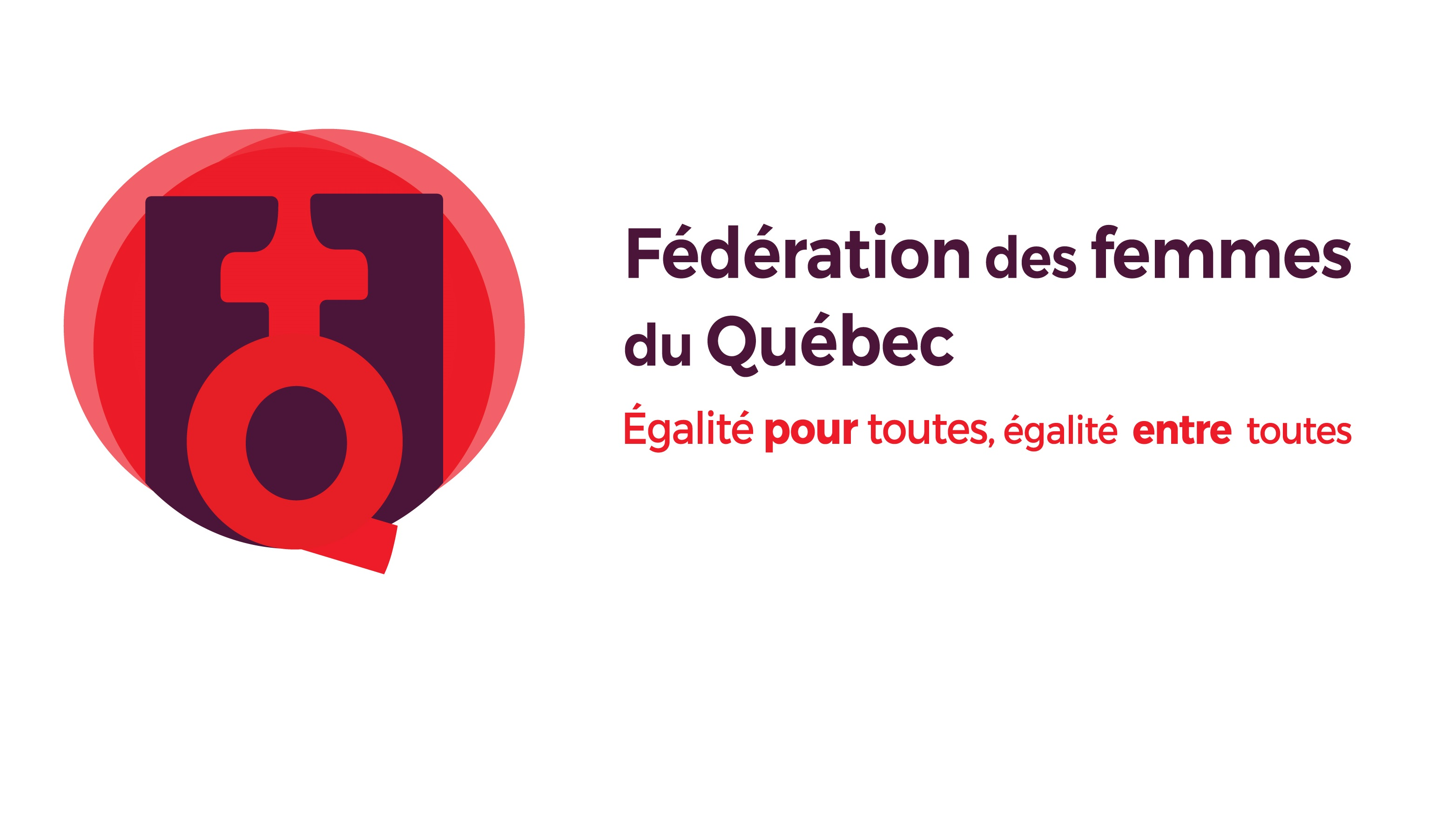
- Formation: 1966
- Founder: Thérèse Casgrain
- Location: Montreal, Canada
- Key people: Françoise David, Alexa Conradi, Réjane Laberge-Colas, Monique Bégin
- Website: www.ffq.qc.ca

The Fédération des femmes du Québec (FFQ; English: "Quebec Women's Federation") is a feminist organization binding individuals and groups in a common goal to "promote and defend the interests and the rights of women and to fight against all forms of violence, discrimination, marginalization and exclusion towards women" in Quebec, Canada.

== History ==
The FFQ was founded in 1966 at the initiative of Thérèse Casgrain, a human rights activist and leading feminist who contributed greatly to the achievement of women suffrage in Quebec. From the beginning, the FFQ organized symposiums, conferences, information campaigns, prepared memoirs and spoke for the interests of women in all tribunes, especially parliamentary and government consultations.

Between 1992 and 2002, associative membership rose from 60 to 160 organizations and individual membership from 100 to 860.

== Principles and mission ==
The Déclaration de principes adopted by members during the 2003 annual congress state that the FFQ is:

- a place of militantism and action, analysis and reflexion, debate, training and concertation open to all women, without distinction of origin, sexual orientation, religion etc. (in accord with article 10 of Quebec's Charter of Human Rights and Freedoms).
- participating to the current within the movement of women that fights against the systems of oppression or domination that are patriarchy, capitalism, racism, imperialism which marginalize and exploits women at the social, economic, cultural, political and religious level, in Quebec and abroad.

== Organization and structure ==
Legally, the FFQ is charitable organization registered as a corporation in Quebec, Canada, and whose headquarters are in Montreal. It relies on the contributions of its members, donation and subsidies for the financing of its operations. Its decisions are taken democratically through the general assembly of all its members and a 19-member administration council oversees the conduct of the adopted policies.

== Activities ==
Among the activities of the FFQ which have been most successful are the 1995 Bread and Roses March and the 2000 World March of Women.

== Presidents ==
- Réjane Laberge-Colas (1966-1967)
- Rita Racette-Cadieux (1967-1969)
- Marie-Paul Marcil Dandois (1969-1970)
- Yvette Boucher-Rousseau (1970-1973)
- Ghislaine Patry-Buisson (1973-1977)
- Sheila Finestone (1977-1980)
- Gabrielle Hotte (1980-1981)
- Huguette Lapointe-Roy (1981-1983)
- Denyse Bélanger-Rochon (1983-1985)
- Ginette Drouin-Busque (1985-1989)
- Constance Middleton-Hope (1989)
- Denise Crête (1990-1991) (interim)
- Germaine Vaillancourt (1991-1992)
- Céline Signori (1992-1994)
- Françoise David (1994-2001)
- Vivian Barbot (2001-2003)
- Michèle Asselin (2003-2009)
- Alexa Conradi (2009-2015)
- Mélanie Sarazin (2015-2017)
- Gabrielle Bouchard (2017-2020)

The FFQ's president position has been vacant since Gabrielle Bouchard's departure.

== Prix Idola Saint-Jean ==
Since 1991, the FFQ awards the Prix Idola Saint-Jean to a person or a group that made an exceptional contribution to the betterment of the condition of women in Quebec and the promotion of feminism, in conformity with the principles, mission and orientation of the federation.
