= Freedom of Information and Protection of Privacy Act =

Freedom of Information and Protection of Privacy Act may refer to:

- Freedom of Information and Protection of Privacy Act (Alberta)
- Freedom of Information and Protection of Privacy Act (British Columbia)
- Freedom of Information and Protection of Privacy Act (Manitoba)
- Freedom of Information and Protection of Privacy Act (Nova Scotia)
- Freedom of Information and Protection of Privacy Act (Ontario)
- Freedom of Information and Protection of Privacy Act (Prince Edward Island)
- Freedom of Information and Protection of Privacy Act (Saskatchewan)
