= Treasury Board of Canada =

Cabinet committee of the Privy Council of Canada responsible for financial management

Coordinates: 45.4189°N 75.6970°W

- Conseil du Trésor du Canada
- Abbreviation: TB
- Formation: 1867
- Type: Cabinet committee; committee of the King’s Privy Council for Canada
- Members: Appointment by Prime Minister of Canada
- President of the Treasury Board: Shafqat Ali
- Parent organization: King's Privy Council for Canada; Canadian Ministry
- Staff: Treasury Board of Canada Secretariat
- Website: www.canada.ca/en/treasury-board-secretariat.html

The Treasury Board of Canada (French: Conseil du Trésor du Canada) is a cabinet committee of the Canadian Ministry, alongside which it is also a committee of the King’s Privy Council for Canada, overseeing the spending and operation of the Government of Canada and is the principal employer of the core public service. The committee is supported by the Treasury Board of Canada Secretariat, its administrative branch and a department within the government itself.

The committee is chaired by the president of the Treasury Board, currently Shafqat Ali, who is also the minister responsible for the Treasury Board of Canada Secretariat.

== Role ==
The Canadian Cabinet is arranged into several committees with varying responsibilities, but all other ones are informal structures and frequently change. Currently organized under the Financial Administration Act, the Treasury Board is the only one created by law and is officially a committee of the Privy Council.

Its role in government makes it far more powerful than most Cabinet committees as it is responsible for "accountability and ethics, financial, personnel and administrative management, comptrollership, approving regulations and most Orders-in-Council". It is also unique in that its committee chair, the president of the Treasury Board, is a member of Cabinet by virtue of holding that office—other Cabinet committees are chaired by ministers holding seats in Cabinet by virtue of some other office.

It has administered since February 2009 the Values and Ethics Code for the Public Sector through its Office of the Chief Human Resources Officer. It took on this role from the Canada Public Service Agency.

=== Expenditure management ===
The Treasury Board oversees the expenditures of the federal government. Ministers submit funding proposals on behalf of their departments to seek financial approval for programs and policies approved in the federal budget or by Cabinet. The president of the Treasury Board is responsible for presenting the Estimates from these submissions to Parliament. The Estimates are prepared by the Secretariat in collaboration with the Department of Finance Canada.

=== Management and performance policies and principal employer ===
The Treasury Board, on advice of the Secretariat, sets policies regulating the authority of ministers and deputy ministers to administer and manage their departments, ensuring a government-wide approach to administration.

As the principal employer of the Government of Canada, it is responsible for labour relations, collective bargaining, and pension and benefits across the core public administration.

== Secretariat ==
The Treasury Board is supported by the Treasury Board of Canada Secretariat, a federal department which acts as a central agency of the Government of Canada and is administered by members of the public service. The role of the Secretariat is to advise members the Treasury Board, develop policies for approval and administer certain programs on behalf of the Treasury Board.

== Membership ==
The Treasury Board is composed of six Cabinet ministers, always including its president and the minister of finance. The current members, as of May 2, 2025, are as follows:

Membership of the Treasury Board of Canada
Member	Ministerial portfolio	Notes
Shafqat Ali	President of the Treasury Board	Chair
François-Philippe Champagne	Minister of Finance and National Revenue	Vice-chair
Joël Lightbound	Minister of Government Transformation, Public Services and Procurement	Member
Julie Dabrusin	Minister of Environment and Climate Change	Member
Marjorie Michel	Minister of Health	Member
Maninder Sidhu	Minister of International Trade	Member

There are also a number of alternate members, who may attend Treasury Board meetings in the event of conflicts of interest. The prime minister, through a Governor in Council appointment, may designate as many alternate members as the committee may need. As of May 19, 2025, the following are alternate members of the Treasury Board:

Alternate members of the Treasury Board of Canada
Alternate member	Ministerial portfolio
Randy Boissonnault	Minister of Employment, Workforce Development and Official Languages
Jean-Yves Duclos	Minister of Public Services and Procurement
Sean Fraser	Minister of Housing, Infrastructure and Communities
Gudie Hutchings	Minister of Rural Economic Development and Minister responsible for the Atlantic Canada Opportunities Agency
Mary Ng	Minister of Export Promotion, International Trade and Economic Development
Carla Qualtrough	Minister of Sport and Physical Activity
Dan Vandal	Minister of Northern Affairs, Minister responsible for Prairies Economic Development Canada, and Minister responsible for the Canadian Northern Economic Development Agency
Jonathan Wilkinson	Minister of Energy and Natural Resources

== See also ==
- Security clearances
- Info Source
- Common Look and Feel

=== Related legislation ===
- Access to Information Act
- Auditor General Act
- Official Languages Act
- Privacy Act, 1983
- Security of Information Act
