= Freedom of information in Canada =

Freedom of information in Canada describes the capacity for the Canadian government to provide timely and accurate access to internal data concerning government services. Each province and territory in Canada has its own access to freedom of information legislation.

== History ==
By 1982, twelve countries, including France, Denmark, Finland, Sweden, the Netherlands, and the U.S. (1966), had enacted modern ATI legislation. Canada's Access to Information Act came into force in 1983, under the Pierre Trudeau government.

In 1987, the Solicitor General tabled a unanimous report to Parliament, Open and Shut: Enhancing the Right to Know and the Right to Privacy which contained over 100 recommendations for amending the ATI and privacy acts.

In 1998, the government would append a clause to the Access Act, making it a federal offence to destroy, falsify, or conceal public documents. However, the standards for document production and retention in Canada are still considered insufficient by many scholars.

In August 2000, the Ministry of Justice and the president of the Treasury Board launched a task force to review the Access Act. The committee's report, delivered in June 2002, found "a crisis in information management" within government.

Université de Moncton professor Donald Savoie’s 2003 book, Breaking the Bargain, argues that in Canada, there is a reluctance to put anything in writing, including e-mail, that might find its way into public discourse.

In the fall of 2003, John Bryden, attempted to initiate a comprehensive overhaul of the Act through a private members bill, Bill C-462, which died on the Order Paper with the dissolution of the 37th Parliament in May 2004. A similar bill was introduced by NDP MP Pat Martin on 7 October 2004 as Bill C-201.

In April 2005, the Justice Minister Irwin Cotler introduced a discussion paper entitled A Comprehensive Framework for Access to Information Reform.

On April 1, 2008, the Stephen Harper government shut down CAIRS, the access to information database. He justified this decision by saying that CAIRS was "deemed expensive, [and] deemed to slow down the access to information." In response, Leader of the Opposition Stéphane Dion described Harper's government as "the most secretive government in the history of our country."

In September 2008, a 393-page report sponsored by several Canadian newspaper groups compared Canada's Access to Information Act to the FOI laws of the provinces and of 68 other nations titled: Fallen Behind: Canada's Access to Information Act in the World Context.

In 2009, The Walrus published a detailed history of FOI in Canada.

In 2026, the Doug Ford government announced changes to Ontario's existing FOI laws, restricting access to government records from the premier's office, Cabinet ministers, and parliamentary assistants. The legislation faced backlash from opposition parties and Ontario's privacy commissioner.

== Federal ==
In Canada, the Access to Information Act allows citizens to demand records from federal bodies. The act came into force in 1983, under the Pierre Trudeau government, permitting Canadians to retrieve information from government files, establishing what information could be accessed, mandating timelines for response. Any exceptions to that right of access (i.e. information that is not disclosed) is limited and specific. That means that government departments cannot simply refuse to disclose whole documents or series of documents. This is enforced by the Information Commissioner of Canada.

In general, the types of information that can be exempted from disclosure include: information that could affect federal - provincial relations; information provided to the federal government in confidence by other governments; information affecting the safety and security of individuals; information that belongs to third party private sector companies; solicitor - client privilege and information that, if disclosed, could undermine the operations of government. This is not an exhaustive list.

There is also a complementary Privacy Act, introduced in 1983. The purpose of the Privacy Act is to extend the present laws of Canada that protect the privacy of individuals with respect to personal information about themselves held by a federal government institution and that provide individuals with a right of access to that information. Complaints for possible violations of the Act may be reported to the Privacy Commissioner of Canada. However, freedom of information commissioners often lack the resources to enforce accountability.

Canadian access to information laws distinguish between access to records generally and access to records that contain personal information about the person making the request. Subject to exceptions, individuals have a right of access to records that contain their own personal information under the Privacy Act but the general public does not have a right of access to records that contain personal information about others under the Access to Information Act.

From 1989 to 2008, requests made to the federal government were catalogued in the Coordination of Access to Information Requests System. Library and Archives Canada has been criticized for requiring waiting periods of as much as 80 years to access some files.

The federal legislations do not apply to the provinces or territories, but these levels of government also have access and privacy legislation.

== Provincial ==
| Province | Year | Title | Resource |
|---|---|---|---|
| Nova Scotia | 1977 (S.N.S. 1993, c.5). Amended 1993 | Freedom of Information and Protection of Privacy Act | http://foipop.ns.ca//legislation |
| New Brunswick | 2010 (S.N.B. 2009, c.R-10.6) / 2010 (S.N.B. 2009, c.P-7.05) | Right to Information and Protection of Privacy Act / Personal Health Information Privacy and Access Act | https://web.archive.org/web/20110604064231/http://www.gnb.ca/0062/acts/acts/r-10-6.htm https://web.archive.org/web/20110515070123/http://www.gnb.ca/0062/PDF-acts/p-07-05.pdf |
| Newfoundland and Labrador | 1981 Freedom of Information and Protection of Privacy Act. (R.S.N. 1990, c.F25) / 2002 Access to Information and Protection of Privacy Act (S.N.L. 2002, c.A-1.1). | Freedom of Information and Protection of Privacy Act (1981) / Access to Information and Protection of Privacy Act (2002) | http://www.oipc.gov.nl.ca/legislation.htm |
| Quebec | 1982 (R.S.Q., c.A-21) | Act respecting Access to documents held by public bodies and the Protection of personal information | http://www.cai.gouv.qc.ca/index.html |
| Yukon | 1984 (R.S.Y. 2002, c.1) | Access to Information and Protection of Privacy Act | http://www.atipp.gov.yk.ca/ |
| Manitoba | 1985 (C.C.S.M., c.F175) | Freedom of Information and Protection of Privacy Act | https://web.archive.org/web/20090415051754/http://www.ombudsman.mb.ca/legislation.htm |
| Ontario | 1987 royal assent. In force 1988 | Freedom of Information and Protection of Privacy Act | https://web.archive.org/web/20090118181543/http://www.ipc.on.ca/index.asp?navid=4 |
| Ontario (municipal) | 1990 (R.S.O. 1990, c.M56) Royal assent 1989, in force 1991 | Municipal Freedom of Information and Protection of Privacy Act | http://www.e-laws.gov.on.ca/html/statutes/english/elaws_statutes_90m56_e.htm |
| Saskatchewan | 1991. (S.S. 1990–91, c.F-22.01) | Freedom of Information and Protection of Privacy Act | https://web.archive.org/web/20090703063728/http://www.oipc.sk.ca/legislation.htm (Statute, on Commissioner's website) |
| Saskatchewan (municipal) | 1991 (S.S. 1990–91, c.F-22.01) | Local Authority Freedom of Information and Protection of Privacy Act | http://www.qp.gov.sk.ca/documents/English/Statutes/Statutes/L27-1.pdf |
| British Columbia | 1992 [1993 in force] (R.S.B.C. 1996, c.165.) Amended since. | Freedom of Information and Protection of Privacy Act | https://www.oipc.bc.ca/about/legislation/ / https://www.oipc.bc.ca/ - Commissioner's office / www.fipa.bc.ca - FIPA |
| Alberta | 1994. (R.S.A. 2000, c.F-25) | Freedom of Information and Protection of Privacy Act | http://www.qp.alberta.ca/1266.cfm?page=F25.cfm&leg_type=Acts&isbncln=9780779743568 (on Alberta's government website) |
| Northwest Territories | 1994 (S.N.W.T. 1994, c.20). Amended several times | Access to Information and Protection of Privacy Act | https://web.archive.org/web/20080512003333/http://www.justice.gov.nt.ca/ATIPP/atipp.htm |
| Prince Edward Island | 2001 (R.S.P.E.I. 1988, c.F-15.01) | Freedom of Information and Protection of Privacy Act | http://www.gov.pe.ca/foipp/index.php3 / http://www.assembly.pe.ca/index.php3?number=1013943 - Commissioner's office |
| Nunavut | 2000 (S.N.W.T. 1994, c.20) On April 1, 2000, Nunavut adopted the laws of the Northwest Territories until such time as it replaces those laws with its own / See Nunavut commissioner's 2006-07 annual report at - http://www.assembly.nu.ca/public_docs/info_privacy_0607.pdf | Access to Information and Protection of Privacy Act | https://web.archive.org/web/20100226044708/http://www.info-privacy.nu.ca/en/home |

== See also ==
- Freedom of information in the United Kingdom
- Freedom of information in the United States
- Open data in Canada
- Proactive Disclosure
