= Freedom of Information and Protection of Privacy Act (British Columbia) =

British Columbia, Canada statute

The Freedom of Information and Protection of Privacy Act (R.S.B.C., 1996, c.165) is an Act of the Legislative Assembly of British Columbia governing the public sector. It is commonly abbreviated "FIPPA" or "FOIPPA", though other Canadian provinces such as Alberta, and Ontario, use similar FIPPA acronyms for their public sector privacy law. "BC FIPPA" can be used as an acronym for further differentiation. FIPPA holds public bodies "accountable for their information practices". The legislation defines public sector requirements for collection, use, disclosure and safeguarding of individuals' personal information, decrees individuals' right to access public sector records, including access to an individual's "own 'personal information' as well as records in the custody or control of a 'public body' "—subject to specific exemptions. FIPPA requires public bodies to "take reasonable steps to protect the privacy of personal information they hold". Independent oversight and enforcement for FIPPA rests with the Office of the Information and Privacy Commissioner for British Columbia (OIPC BC).

== History ==
In 1990, the Social Credit Vander Zalm government of British Columbia was under pressure from the NDP opposition to release flight logs regarding use of the government airplane fleet. The fleet was “intended for use mostly as an air ambulance service” but was also “available for use by ministers and senior civil servants when not being used for medical purposes”. Caroline Gran, Minister of Government Management Services “agreed to release the records after coming under attack for using government jets”. Certain planes were detouring from regular government routes between Boundary Bay (Delta, BC) and Victoria Airport (BC, near the provincial capital) to land at Abbotsford Airport. Abbotsford airport was near Gran's residence. Gran “maintained the detours were for government business”. However, The Globe and Mail reported that “the method of releasing the [flight] information has not satisfied opposition demands for full disclosure of the use of government jets”.

The government provided access to flight data for legislative members and media covering the years 1987–1990. Access to the hard copy flight logs was provided in a secured committee room where they were available 4 hours a day for two days. While some details of flights and passengers were available, they did “not indicate the purpose of the trip, allowing others to speculate whether specific flights were for events on the same date”. NDP transportation critic Dale Lovick had stated in a previous interview that “flight records should be presented to the Legislature and should not be available only at the discretion of the minister” while Gran stated that the manner of providing access followed “traditional government procedures”.

At the time of the legislative debate over access to government flight records, Darrell Evans (who would go on to co-found and serve as first Executive Director of the BC Freedom of Information and Privacy Association) was returning to BC from the US. He was struck by the debate over access to government records, and questioned initial government rationale for refusing and restricting access to the flight logs. At this point there was no freedom of information law in BC and Evans thought, “Why not form a group to lobby campaign for a freedom of information act?"

== See also ==
- Canadian privacy law
- Freedom of information in Canada
- Personal Information Protection and Electronic Documents Act
