= Freedom of Information and Protection of Privacy Act (Manitoba) =

Manitoba, Canada statute

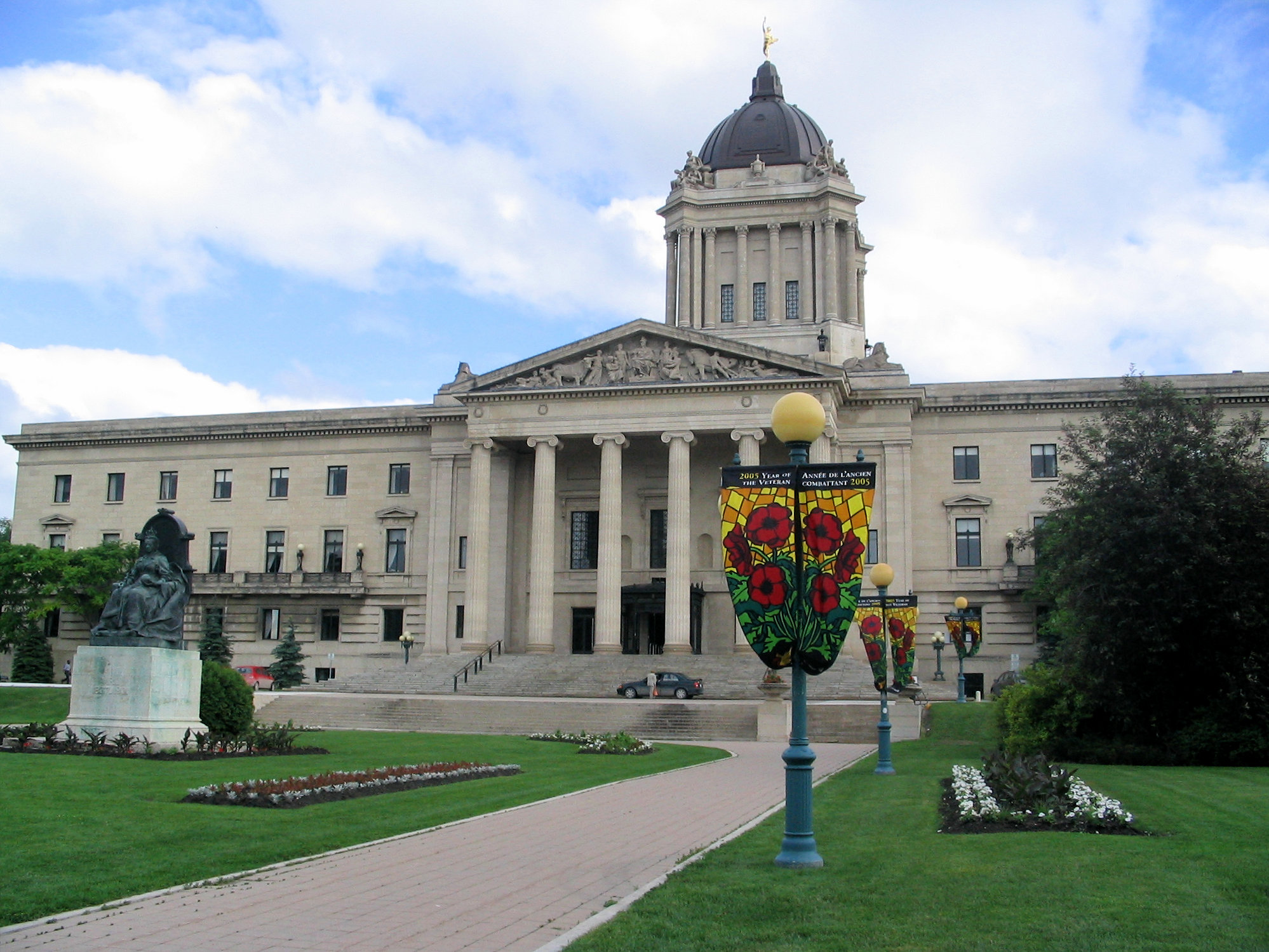

Legislative Assembly of Manitoba
- Citation: C.C.S.M. c. F175
- Assented to: June 28, 1997
- Effective: May 4, 1998
- Administered by: Information and Privacy Policy Secretariat (Manitoba Finance)

Legislative history
- First reading: June 4, 1997

Amended by
- SM 2018, c. 6, s. 41
- Status: Current legislation

The Freedom of Information and Protection of Privacy Act (FIPPA; French: Loi sur l'accès à l'information et la protection de la vie privée) is an act of the Manitoba Legislature in the Canadian province of Manitoba that is both an access-to-information statute and an information-privacy statute.

It enables the right of access to records held by public agencies in the province and governs the handling of personal information by these agencies.

The provincial Minister of Finance is responsible for the province-wide administration of the Act. Central administration and coordination of FIPPA are carried out by the Information and Privacy Policy Secretariat, under Manitoba Finance. The Secretariat advises the provincial government on issues of information accessibility, confidentiality, and privacy policy. It also provides support services to other public entities under FIPPA.

== Overview ==
Under the Act, members of the public have the right (subject to certain exemptions) to see and obtain copies of records from Manitoba government departments, government agencies, local governments, school divisions, universities and colleges, regional health authorities, and other local public bodies.

The Act protects individuals' personal information by establishing rules for the collection, use, and disclosure of personal information by public bodies. It also provides individuals the right to access their own personal information and to correct any information that public bodies hold about them.

FIPPA does not apply to: (1) private-sector businesses, non-profit organizations or professional organizations, which may be governed by the federal Personal Information Protection and Electronic Documents Act; or (2) federal government departments, agencies, and crown corporations, which may be covered by the federal Access to Information Act and Privacy Act.

When public bodies withhold information from a record or withhold a record completely, they must indicate which "exception" provision of FIPPA was used to authorize the decision to refuse access. Public bodies are required to deny access if a mandatory exception applies to the requested information, but may choose to release or withhold information if a discretionary exception applies.

== Administration ==
The provincial Minister of Finance is responsible for the province-wide administration of the Act. Central administration and coordination of FIPPA are carried out by the Information and Privacy Policy Secretariat, a branch of Manitoba Finance. The Secretariat advises the provincial government on issues of information accessibility, confidentiality, and privacy policy, as well as support services to other public entities under FIPPA. (The minister responsible for the act was previously the Minister of Sport, Culture and Heritage, and the Information and Privacy Policy Secretariat was part of Manitoba Sport, Culture and Heritage.)

The Secretariat provides guidance to Access and Privacy Coordinators and Officers of all public bodies on the administrative requirements of FIPPA.

The Secretariat works closely with the Manitoba Archives and the Government Records Office. Regarding FIPPA, the functions of Manitoba Archives are directly related to its responsibility to administer the records management program of the Government of Manitoba under the provincial Archives and Recordkeeping Act. The Archivist of Manitoba establishes policies, standards, and guidelines for government recordkeeping and approves departmental and agency "records schedules." (According to the Secretariat, a "‘records schedule’ is the formal, written plan that identifies government records, establishes their retention periods and provides for their disposition.")

== Statistics ==
In 2019, government departments and agencies of Manitoba reported receiving 2,500 requests for access, an increase from the 2,323 requests received during 2018. The departments that received the highest number of requests were Manitoba Justice (292), and Health, Seniors and Active Living (257).

Top 10 requests for personal and general information, 2019
Department	Number of requests
Justice	292
Health, Seniors and Active Living	257
Families	251
Education and Training/Education	220
Finance	204
Sustainable Development/Conservation and Climate	157
Manitoba Public Insurance	119
Executive Council	117
Growth, Enterprise and Trade/Economic Development and Training	114
Infrastructure	104

Reasons for denial of access, 2019
Sections of the act used	Exceptions to disclosure	Number of requests applied
Mandatory
17	Third party's privacy	424
18	Third party's business interests	169
19	Cabinet confidences	166
20	Information provided in confidence by another government	78
Discretionary
21	Harmful to relations between Manitoba and other governments	95
22	Local public body confidences	2
23	Advice to public body	612
24	Harmful to individual and public safety	40
25	Harmful to law enforcement or legal proceedings	75
26	Harmful to security of property	54
27	Solicitor–client privilege	81
28	Harmful to economic and other interests of a public body	84
29	Testing procedures, tests and audits	8
30	Confidential evaluations about the applicant	2
31	Preservation of heritage resources and life forms	0
32	Information that will be available to the public	28

== History ==
In 1988, the Freedom of Information Act gave Manitoba its first access-to-government-information legislation. It provided for access by members of the public to records held by the Government of Manitoba and government agencies, with certain exemptions. The Act provided limited protection for personal information by treating third-party personal information as an exemption to disclosure. However, it was an access to information statute only; it did not protect all personal information that was collected, used, and disclosed by the government. Moreover, the access rights provided in this Act were limited to only those records held by Manitoba's government departments and Crown agencies, but did not apply to other public bodies in the province, such as municipalities, public schools, regional health authorities, etc.

Following public consultation and substantial research on similar legislation in other jurisdictions, the Freedom of Information and Protection of Privacy Act (FIPPA) was drafted. In May 1996, a discussion paper titled "Access to Information and Privacy Protection for Manitoba" was distributed. The public was invited to respond to the paper, as they did: many individuals, organizations, and government departments made oral and written submissions about new access and privacy legislation. On 4 June 1997, FIPPA was introduced in the Manitoba Legislature by the Minister of Culture, Heritage and Citizenship, and was passed on June 27 that year. It was proclaimed in effect with respect to provincial government departments and government agencies on 4 May 1998, and for the City of Winnipeg on August 31.

A couple of years later, on 3 April 2000, FIPPA was extended to other local public bodies, such as school divisions, other municipalities, regional health authorities, etc.

On 1 May 2008, the Minister of Culture, Heritage and Tourism tabled Bill 31, The Freedom of Information and Protection of Privacy Amendment Act, which was passed on 9 October 2008.

This Act amends certain provisions of FIPPA and is in effect as of January 1, 2011.

== See also ==
- Freedom of Information and Protection of Privacy Act (disambiguation) (in other provinces)
