= Treasury Board Secretariat =

Treasury Board Secretariat could refer to

- Treasury Board Secretariat (Ontario)
- Treasury Board of Canada Secretariat
