= Coordination of Access to Information Requests System =

Canadian database of freedom of information requests

The Coordination of Access to Information Requests System, also known as CAIRS, was a database of freedom of information requests made to the federal government of Canada under the Access to Information Act. It was operated by the Department of Public Works and Government Services. It was created in 1989 to internally track requests, and eventually allowed for access to previously filed requests, previously released documents, and then current requests. By 2008, millions of documents had been made available through CAIRS. In 2001, Public Works spent Can$166,000 upgrading the system.

Effective April 1, 2008, the Treasury Board has stated that "the requirement to update CAIRS is no longer in effect". The database was shut down due to high maintenance costs and its inefficiency, as stated by the Conservative Prime Minister Stephen Harper. Treasury Board President Vic Toews described the system as a tool used to inhibit freedom of information:

If anyone made a request that was considered sensitive, the request was shipped to the appropriate Liberal minister. At that point the Liberal minister would manage, control or delay the request. That was the purpose of the system. That is a pretty convenient system the Liberals had, but it is not one that the government will continue with.

In response, Liberal Leader of the Opposition Stéphane Dion described Harper's government as "the most secretive government in the history of our country."

While the government cited Alastair Roberts, a Syracuse University political scientist, as a critic of CAIRS, Roberts publicly commented that he was not in favour of shutting down the system, saying "They really don't care what I think about CAIRS or any other aspect of ATI [access to information]...[i]f they did they would have taken my advice about CAIRS a few years ago when I said they ought to switch on the capacity to make the entire thing publicly accessible." A reproduction of CAIRS was developed and made publicly available by Alasdair Roberts. Roberts acquired digital "monthly reports" from the Treasury Board of the "requests" made through the CAIRS. In July 2004, the reports were scanned and subsequently sent to Roberts in PDF format. The reports were unusable due to the lack of capacity to search the document, therefore rendering Roberts' database ineffective.
