= Public sector ethics =

Ethics in the public sector is a broad topic that is usually considered a branch of political ethics. In the public sector, ethics addresses the fundamental premise of a public administrator's duty as a "steward" to the public. In other words, it is the moral justification and consideration for decisions and actions made during the completion of daily duties when working to provide the general services of government and nonprofit organizations. Ethics is defined as, among others, the entirety of rules of proper moral conduct corresponding to the ideology of a particular society or organization (Eduard). Public sector ethics is a broad topic because values and morals vary between cultures. Despite the differences in ethical values, there is a growing common ground of what is considered good conduct and correct conduct with ethics. Ethics are an accountability standard by which the public will scrutinize the work being conducted by the members of these organizations. The question of ethics emerges in the public sector on account of its subordinate character.

Decisions are based upon ethical principles, which are the perception of what the general public would view as correct. Ensuring the ethical behavior in the public sector requires a permanent reflection on the decisions taken and their impact from a moral point of view on citizens. Having such a distinction ensures that public administrators are not acting on an internal set of ethical principles without first questioning whether those principles would hold to public scrutiny. It also has placed an additional burden upon public administrators regarding the conduct of their personal lives. Public sector ethics is an attempt to create a more open atmosphere within governmental operations.

== Government ethics ==
Government ethics constitutes the application of ethical rules to government. It is that part of practical jurisprudence, or the philosophy of law, that governs the operation of government and its relationship with the people that it governs. It covers issues of honesty and transparency in government, dealing with matters such as bribery, political corruption, police corruption, legislative ethics, regulatory ethics, conflict of interest, avoiding the appearance of impropriety, open government, and legal ethics.

The US office of government ethics was initiated by the Ethics in Government Act of 1978 to provide overall leadership and policy direction for an ethics program in the Executive branch of government. This same picture is mirrored, albeit in a patchy way, across US state administrations. Altogether the US model of Public sector ethics has become highly regulated and, some would say, cumbersome.

Government officials serve the people, managing the resources of others. Along with this stewardship, there is an expectation from the public that in conducting daily activities, the officials will practice fairness and equality. They are also expected to maintain openness in their workings to ensure that they are operating within the public's perception of what is "right." This concept of ethics, a branch of philosophy which seeks to address morality, is not a relatively new idea within government. Niccolò Machiavelli wrote The Prince, which serves as a manual to illustrate what a monarchy should do to maintain power. This treatise is often viewed as a tool of how a public official should not act in modern society, as it is an enumeration of the specific steps one should take to maintain control and power. This idea of control and power conflicts with the underlying principle of being a steward to the general public. As such, this treatise is a springboard for ethical issues in modern-day times.

Paul Douglas, a mid-20th century United States Senator from Illinois, argues that while many may secretly follow Machiavelli in their heart, most do not. “Instead, most men want a life of integrity and goodwill in which public officials are stewards rather than masters and treat their jobs as a means of helping people rather than dominating them”. Douglas further argues why ethical practices are needed. “Our government is now so huge and affects our lives so directly that we cannot be content with merely a moderately decent level of behavior on the part of our public officials. For even a small percentage of misbehavior on the part of these officials can do a vast amount of harm”.

=== Regulatory ethics ===
Regulatory ethics is a body of law and practical political philosophy that governs the conduct of civil servants and the members of regulatory agencies. It addresses issues such as bribery and the relationship of civil servants with the businesses in the industries they regulate, as well as concerns about transparency, freedom of information and sunshine laws, and conflict of interest rules.

While Machiavelli and Douglas are distant in time, the two opposing viewpoints of the types of public administrators, and the ethical stance of the decisions they make, are very relevant today. Further illustrating the bifurcation of thought on ethics in government, Cody and Lynn discuss the two opposing factors: utilitarian's and deontologists.

Utilitarians: Believe that the end sought justifies the means to that end. In other words, if an ethical solution is more costly, a utilitarian will argue from a standpoint of efficiency or effectiveness to justify a less ethical solution.

Deontologists: Believe that certain absolute principles should be obeyed, regardless of the consequences. An example of an absolute principle would be honesty.

The definition of these two behavioral models is not necessarily exclusive. It is possible for a person to make a decision based upon a utilitarian stance and then follow a deontological stance for a separate decision. This is because the concept of ethics is vague and ultimately is based upon principles and values, which will differ among situations and people. The Canadian federal government has developed a document called the Values and Ethics Code for the Public Sector in order to guide the agents of the Public Service.

== Public Sector Ethics vs. Government Ethics ==
Public sector ethics deals with ethics for those who serve in the public sector- primarily governmental and elected officials focusing on the public, whom they serve. While public sector ethics overlaps in part with government ethics, it can be considered a separate branch in that government ethics is only focused on moral issues relating to governments, including bribery and corruption, whilst public sector ethics also encompasses any position included in the public administration field. Public administration ethics does cover relations among politicians, but it also covers politicians and the concerned parties in the outside world: elected public servants, the media, public sector entities, and individuals.

== Ethical standards ==
John Rohr, in defining bureaucrats as public administrators, approaches ethic standards in government as a requirement due to the nature of the work of administrators. He writes, “because bureaucrats govern through authority that is discretionary, and because they are not elected, the ordinary means of popular control are inapplicable”. Rohr assumes that public administrators are working to benefit the general public's needs. When an elected official does not act in line with the public's expectations, they can be removed from office. However, public administrators are protected with due process rights as government employees, and ethical violations can be difficult to justify the removal of a person from an office.

Many questions about how ethics should be addressed in government exist. According to Cody and Lynn, the debate centers on the extent to which one would like to detail ethical standards. For example, they cite the general litmus test for administrators regarding whether or not they would like to hear about their actions on the front page of tomorrow's newspaper. That is, public officials should gauge their decisions through the lens of the public reading about the decision on the front page of a newspaper. If it would be viewed as a problem by the public, then the administrator should refrain from the action in question.

The Honest Person Rule: Unless there is an underlying honesty within people, a set of ethical rules is meaningless. This supporting argument for the general guidelines maintains that for ethical standards to be practical an individual must be ethically sound from the beginning. As Cody and Lynn point out, it is possible for a public official to act unethically, but not be personally dishonest.

The litmus test example and the Honest Person Rule are broad standards without much definition. As a consequence, broadly defined ethical standards are difficult to assess regarding concerns of ethical violations. In order to have greater accountability, more specific standards are needed, or a statement of applied ethics.

To further provide some definition, Rohr classifies ethics in government with some of the approaches that have been taken. The USDA devised a system where employees were asked questions and then asked to rank the actions as permissible, not permissible, and permissible with prior written approval. Rohr argues that this type of approach, known as the Low Road merely places an understanding of what not to do in order to steer clear of trouble (1978, pp. 53–54). This approach does not assist an employee in providing a standard for what is truly ethical behavior.

The High Road, according to Rohr, is the basis of decisions upon a pursuit for social equity, which is based upon political philosophy and humanistic psychology.

Rohr finds problems with both the Low Road and High Road approaches and bases his argument on regime values, or “the values of that political entity that was brought into being by the ratification of the Constitution that created the present American republic” (1978, p. 59). He contends that regime values are built upon three considerations:

1. Ethical norms should be derived from the salient values of the regime;
2. These values are normative for bureaucrats because they have taken an oath to uphold the regime; and
3. These values can be discovered in the public law of the regime.

The basic contention upon which Rohr builds his argument is that rulings by the Supreme Court are sufficient measures upon which an ethical framework can be constructed. Rohr argues that this framework for ethical standards is strong because it relies upon a system of checks and balances in the judicial system and because it is built upon the interpretation of framers' intents of how and why government exists.

== Levels of ethical decision-making ==
Terry Cooper is an often-cited author in the field of public administration ethics. His book, The Responsible Administrator, is an in-depth attempt to bridge the philosophical points of ethics and the complex workings of public administration. While not revolutionary, his work has become a focal point around which ethical decision-making in the public sector are made. In The Responsible Administrator, he states that public administrators make decisions daily according to a distinctive four-level process. The four levels are:

The Expressive Level: At this stage, a person responds to a situation with "spontaneous, reflective expressions of emotion ... which neither invite a reply nor attempt to persuade others".

The Level of Moral Rules: This is the first level at which we begin to question actions and begin to look for alternatives and consequences. The responses at this level are often built upon "moral rules we acquire through the socialization process from our families, religious affiliations, education and personal experiences." Decisions on how to handle the situation are then whittled down based on what we feel is the most appropriate action within our own personal moral bank.

The Level of Ethical Analysis: There are times when a personal moral code will seem inadequate for the situation, or that the alternatives and consequences do not feel right. When this occurs, a person has entered this level and begins to examine their ethical principles, or "statements concerning the conduct or state of being that is required for the fulfillment of a value; it explicitly links a value with a general mode of action". Particularly, at this level, one begins to reexamine their personal values, and may eventually disagree with actions to such an extent that they will become "whistleblowers."

The Post-ethical Level: At this level, questions arise about one's view of the world and human nature, how we know anything to be true, and the meaning of life. Here there is a philosophical examination as to why ethical standards are important and relevant to the individual.

These levels are progressive and as an individual begins to move from level to the next, they will begin to question increasingly more the fundamental assumptions upon which the decision-making process is built. It is important to understand the level of thinking upon which a decision is made to ensure that a decision has been tested for strength and a public sense of validity.

== Cooper's decision-making model ==
Cooper devised a method of moving from an ethical problem to appropriate alternatives and consequences. This model follows a sequential, rational approach to ethical decision-making. This method utilizes description and prescription, where public administrators begin to describe to themselves and others an objective state of affairs, and then begin to suggest steps to change the situation.

The steps to this process are as follows:

1. The Descriptive Task: A problem is often presented in a fragmented, distorted fashion coupled with judgmental language and inflections. Cooper contends that the administrator is in a position to have more complete knowledge when an issue is brought forward. Additionally, an administrator should attempt to describe questionable situations void of personal feelings (moving beyond the expressive level).
2. Defining the Ethical Issue: Often the most misinterpreted step, with defining the ethical issue, an administrator is not charged with defining the problem. Instead, there is an examination of what is the underlying ethical value that is being addressed. Often, there is a decision made because of a problem, without examination of the ethical issue. This is damaging to the process of decision-making because it harms one's ethical analysis skills and ethical identity. This is true because situations can differ, and practical decision-making may lead to inconsistencies without an ethical base (1990, p. 20).
3. Identifying Alternative Courses of Action: Using a rationalistic approach, an administrator, with as complete knowledge of the situation as possible and an assessment of the ethical issue at hand, identifies all the plausible courses of action in response to the situation.
4. Projecting the Possible Consequences: In this stage, all positive and negative results of each alternative are examined. When discovering the possible positive and negative outcomes of an action, administrators use their moral imagination, or the imagined enactment of how alternatives will play out. Ideally, as more consequences are enumerated, the ethical decision-making process will be strengthened.
5. Finding a Fit: The appropriate solution or alternative is a balance of four elements:
  1. Moral Rules: Those basic standards that can be attributed to the alternatives and their consequences.
  2. Rehearsal of Defenses: The assessment and alignment of alternatives with the accepted norms of the wider professional organization and political communities of which we are a part.
  3. Ethical Principles: In assessing the moral rules, it may become clear that certain moral values are competitive. Therefore, it becomes difficult to say that an alternative which support social justice is more correct than the security of an individual or the organization. Here, an administrator assesses alternatives and their moral values under the light of the level of ethical analysis - deciding how the hierarchy of moral rules is structured and ultimately influencing the final decision.
  4. Anticipatory Self-Appraisal: Simply put, this analysis of alternatives requires an internal reflection of whether an administrator feels that an alternative fits within what he or she perceives to be their own personality. This is an examination of whether an alternative will meet our need to feel satisfied with the decision.

By following Cooper's model of ethical decision-making, a public administrator is able to create a more concrete process by which to assess individual steps that were taken in reaching a decision. This ensures that at each point, an effort was made by the administrator to uphold ethical principles and that fairness and equality were the standard. An administrator's decision must be able to withstand scrutiny to ensure that there is a continued trust and respect for accountability among employees and the public in the administrator's ability to conduct his/her duties.

== Politics and ethics ==
Public administrators act independently of legislators and most elected officials. This ensures that those on elections boards can operate independently of political influence. This is also true of law enforcement. Unfortunately, enforcing ethical violations can lead to consequences for the public administrator. While an officer can enforce a law against an elected official, the elected official can place pressure on others to force the officer to work a night shift or decrease the department.

Rohr would argue that politics and administration are not separate, but are present at the same time when a public administrator makes decisions. He states that the problem with public administrators “is not that bureaucrats are excessively involved in policy formulation but that they are involved at all. This is a problem for a democratic society because to influence public policy as a public official is to govern”. In other words, those officials who are influencing decisions are taking on the role of those elected by the public without a responsibility of having to answer to the public for decisions made.

However, because there can be large political obstacles, it can be difficult for an administrator to overcome ethical concerns within an organization. Sometimes, the culture of an organization is unethical, at which time, it would be useless to bring up ethical concerns within the organization. In the public sector and nonprofits, when this is the case, individuals will often attempt to bring outside scrutiny on to the organization. This is typically done by leaking the ethical concerns to the general media. Such an act is known as whistleblowing.

Whistleblowing: After using all available means for working within the system, an employee of a governmental agency reports a problem to other governmental agencies or to the general public directly. The problem for whistleblowing on all levels of government (federal, state, and local) is that there are very few protections for these individuals.

== Ethics and the personal life of administrators ==
There are several factors of a person's private life that are often viewed as something that is not made available to the public. When a person enters into a public life, often, aspects of their private life are made public.

Health: It is important, in the public's eye, that a public official be physically sound when conducting the duties of their office. For example, when Ronald Reagan had an assassination attempt, he was often reporting how healthy he was. This may have been an attempt to prevent the transfer of power to his Vice President. However, because of the mandate of a transfer of power, it was necessary for the public to understand his overall condition.

Finances: A public official may be a strong steward of public funds, but may have personal financial issues (i.e. failure to pay taxes, etc.). Disclosure of finances is particularly important, ethically, for the public to decide an official's ability to properly manage public funds and to assess an individual's potential for giving into politically charged financial pressure. Opposing viewpoints to this argue that public officials should not have to disclose financial information because they are sometimes linked to personal contacts that prefer to remain anonymous.

Sexual Misconduct: The common view is that a public official's sexual life is subject to scrutiny. This is due to the assumption that any sexual misconduct may lead to the manipulation of the official's daily decisions. It is thereby often the subject of attention when sexual misconduct becomes known to the public.

Appearance of Impropriety: Officials should make public any possible conflicts of interest prior to their actions, in order to avoid public scrutiny when making decisions that could be construed in favor of a personal interest.

== Ethical Climate in the Public Sector ==
Ethical climate in the public sector refers to the psychological conditions present in the public sector workplace and how those conditions influence a public sector employees ethical decision making. One way of interpreting public sector ethics from a theoretical perspective is to view a workers behavior as a function of their psychological field. It is theorized that understanding the ethical climate in which one works explains ones decisions making and can differentiate between and explain why one would make ethical or unethical choices. A study was done examining the ethical climate in the sector through analyzing surveys in which public sector employees responded to a variety of different scenarios where ethical decision making came into play. The researchers looked for correlations between ethical climate environments and the responses to this survey and found that certain ethical climates were linked to positive ethical decision making and some were linked to worse ethical decision making, supporting the researchers thesis.

== See also ==
- Ethical naturalism
- Normative ethics
- Political science
- Political ideology
