= CLF =

CLF may refer to:

- CenturyLink Field, a stadium in Seattle, Washington
- Center for a Livable Future
- Chain-link fencing
- Chlorine monofluoride (ClF)
- Church of the Larger Fellowship, worldwide Unitarian Universalist congregation
- Clear Sky Lodge Airport's FAA LID code
- RAF Coltishall's IATA code
- Cleveland-Cliffs Inc., a business firm specializing in the mining of iron ore in the United States
- Clifton Forge (Amtrak station)'s station code
- The Congressional Leadership Fund, dedicated to electing Republicans to the U.S. House of Representatives
- Conservation Law Foundation, a legal environmental advocacy organization
- Common Log Format - A standardized text file format usually associated with web server logs
- Common Look and Feel, a Government of Canada Internet standard
- Commonwealth Literary Fund (1908–1974), an Australian Government body
- Unidad de Fomento, ISO 4217 code of a Chilean unit of account
