= Constitution of Canada =

Supreme law of Canada

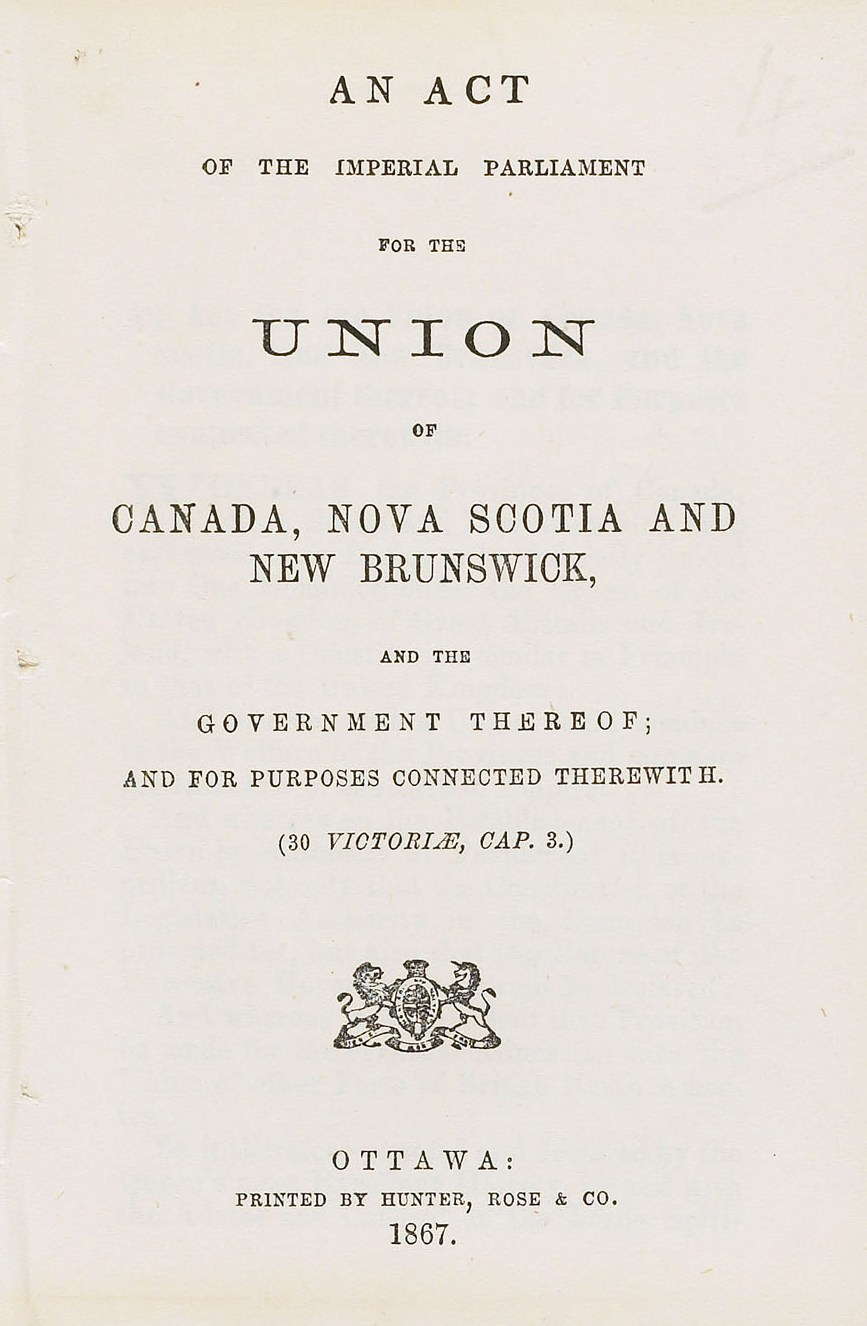
- The Constitution Act, 1867, the foundational document of the Canadian Constitution

Overview
- Jurisdiction: Canada
- Date effective: July 1, 1867
- System: Constitutional monarchy

Government structure
- Branches: 3
- Chambers: Bicameral
- Federalism: Yes
- Last amended: June 23, 2022

The Constitution of Canada (French: Constitution du Canada) is the supreme law in Canada. It outlines Canada's system of government and the civil and human rights of those who are citizens of Canada and non-citizens in Canada. Its contents are an amalgamation of various codified acts, treaties between the Crown and Indigenous Peoples (both historical and modern), uncodified traditions and conventions. Canada is one of the oldest constitutional monarchies in the world.

The Constitution of Canada comprises core written documents and provisions that are constitutionally entrenched, take precedence over all other laws and place substantive limits on government action; these include the Constitution Act, 1867 (formerly the British North America Act, 1867) and the Canadian Charter of Rights and Freedoms. The Constitution Act, 1867 provides for a constitution "similar in principle" to the largely unwritten constitution of the United Kingdom, recognizes Canada as a constitutional monarchy and federal state, and outlines the legal foundations of Canadian federalism.

The Constitution of Canada includes written and unwritten components. Section 52 of the Constitution Act, 1982 states that "the Constitution of Canada is the supreme law of Canada" and that any inconsistent law is of no force or effect. It further lists written documents which are included in the Constitution of Canada; these are the Canada Act 1982 (which includes the Constitution Act, 1982), the acts and orders referred to in its schedule (including in particular the Constitution Act, 1867), and any amendments to these documents.

The Supreme Court of Canada has held that this list is not exhaustive and that the Constitution of Canada includes a number of pre-Confederation acts and unwritten components as well. The Canadian constitution also includes the fundamental principles of federalism, democracy, constitutionalism and the rule of law, and respect for minorities. See list of Canadian constitutional documents for details.

== History of the constitution ==
The first semblance of a constitution for Canada was the Royal Proclamation of 1763. The act renamed the northeasterly portion of the former French province of New France as the Province of Quebec, roughly coextensive with the southern third of contemporary Quebec. The proclamation, which established an appointed colonial government, was the constitution of Quebec until 1774 when the British parliament passed the Quebec Act, which expanded the province's boundaries to the Ohio and Mississippi Rivers (one of the grievances listed in the United States Declaration of Independence). Significantly, the Quebec Act also replaced French criminal law with the English common law system; but the French civil law system was retained for non-criminal matters.

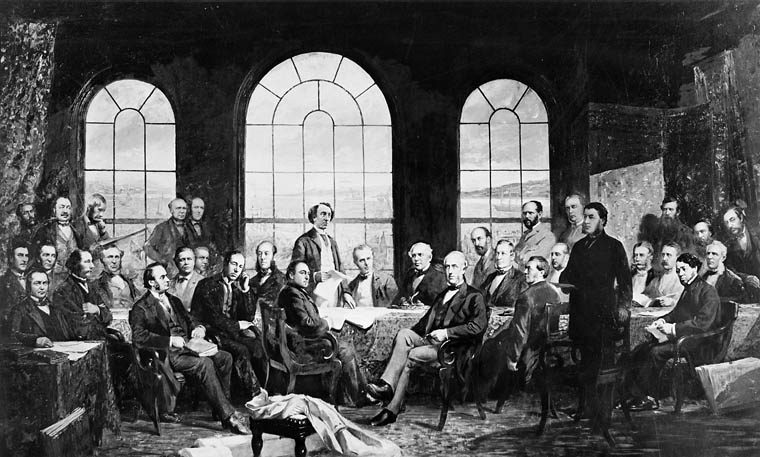
A painting depicting negotiations that would lead to the enactment of the British North America Act, 1867

The Treaty of Paris of 1783 ended the American War of Independence and sent a wave of British loyalist refugees northward to Quebec and Nova Scotia. In 1784, the two provinces were divided: Nova Scotia was split into Nova Scotia, Cape Breton Island (rejoined to Nova Scotia in 1820), Prince Edward Island, and New Brunswick, while Quebec was split into Lower Canada (southern Quebec) and Upper Canada (southern through lower northern Ontario). The winter of 1837–38 saw rebellion in both Canadas, contributing to their re-union as the Province of Canada in 1841.

The British North America Act, 1867 established the Dominion of Canada as a federation of provinces. Initially, on July 1, 1867, four provinces entered into confederation as "One dominion under the name of Canada": Canada West (former Upper Canada, now Ontario), Canada East (former Lower Canada, now Quebec), Nova Scotia, and New Brunswick. Title to the Northwest Territories was transferred by the Hudson's Bay Company in 1870, out of which the province of Manitoba (the first to be established by the Parliament of Canada) was created. British Columbia joined Confederation in 1871, followed by Prince Edward Island in 1873. The Yukon Territory was created by Parliament in 1898, followed by Alberta and Saskatchewan in 1905 (all out of parts of the Northwest Territories). Newfoundland, Britain's oldest colony in the Americas and by then also a Dominion, joined Confederation in 1949. Nunavut was created in 1999 from the Northwest Territories.

An Imperial Conference in 1926 that included the leaders of all Dominions and representatives from India (which then included Burma, Bangladesh, and Pakistan), led to the eventual enactment of the Statute of Westminster 1931. The statute, an essential transitory step from the British Empire to the Commonwealth of Nations, provided that existing Dominions became fully sovereign of the United Kingdom and any new Dominions would be fully sovereign upon the grant of Dominion status. Although listed, Newfoundland never ratified the statute so was still subject to imperial authority when its entire system of government and economy collapsed in the mid-1930s. Canada did ratify the statute but with a requested exception—the Canadian federal and provincial governments could not agree on an amending formula for the Canadian constitution. It would be another 50 years before this was achieved. In the interim, the British parliament periodically passed constitutional amendments when requested by the government of Canada. This was never anything but a rubber stamp.

The patriation of the Canadian constitution was achieved in 1982 when the British parliament, with the request and assent of the Canadian Parliament, passed the Canada Act 1982, which included in its schedules the Constitution Act, 1982. The United Kingdom thus renounced any remaining responsibility for, or jurisdiction over, Canada. In a formal ceremony on Parliament Hill in Ottawa, Queen Elizabeth II proclaimed the Constitution Act, 1982 into law on April 17, 1982.

The Constitution Act, 1982, includes the Canadian Charter of Rights and Freedoms. Before the Charter, various statutes protected an assortment of civil rights and obligations but nothing was enshrined in the constitution until 1982. The Charter has thus placed a strong focus upon individual and collective rights of the people of Canada. The enactment of the Charter of Rights and Freedoms has fundamentally changed much of Canadian constitutional law. The act also codified many previously oral constitutional conventions and made amendment of the constitution in general significantly more difficult. Previously, the Canadian constitution could be formally amended by an act of the British parliament, or by informal agreement between the federal and provincial governments, or even simply by adoption as the custom of an oral convention or performance that shows precedential but unwritten tradition. Since the act, textual amendments must now conform to certain specified provisions in the written portion of the Canadian constitution.

== Constitution Act, 1867 ==
This was an act of the British parliament, originally called the British North America Act 1867. It outlined Canada's system of government, which combines Britain's Westminster model of parliamentary government with the division of sovereignty (federalism). Although it is the first of 20 British North America Acts, it is the most famous as the primary document of Canadian Confederation. With the patriation of the Constitution in 1982, this act was renamed Constitution Act, 1867. In recent years, the 1867 document has mainly served as the basis on which the division of powers between the provinces and the federal government is analyzed.

== Constitution Act, 1982 ==
Endorsed by all provincial governments except that of Quebec, this was the formal act of Parliament that effected Canada's full legislative independence from the United Kingdom. Part V of this act established an amending formula for the Canadian constitution, the lack of which (due to more than 50 years of disagreement between the federal and provincial governments) meant Canada's constitutional amendments still required enactment by the British parliament after the Statute of Westminster in 1931.

The Constitution Act, 1982 was enacted as a schedule to the Canada Act 1982, a British act of Parliament which was introduced at the request of a joint address to Queen Elizabeth II by the Senate and House of Commons of Canada. The version of the Canada Act 1982 which is in force in Britain is in English only, but the version of the act in force in Canada is bilingual, English and French. In addition to enacting the Constitution Act, 1982, the Canada Act 1982 provides that no further British acts of Parliament will apply to Canada as part of its law, finalizing Canada's legislative independence.

=== Canadian Charter of Rights and Freedoms ===
As noted above, this is Part I of the Constitution Act, 1982. The Charter is the constitutional guarantee of the civil rights and liberties of every citizen in Canada, such as freedom of expression, of religion, and of mobility. Part II addresses the rights of Aboriginal peoples in Canada.

It is written in plain language to ensure accessibility to the average citizen. It applies only to government and government actions to prevent the government from creating unconstitutional laws.

=== Amending formula ===
Instead of the usual parliamentary procedure, which includes the monarch's formal royal assent for enacting legislation, amendments to any of the acts that collectively form the constitution must be done in accordance with Part V of the Constitution Act, 1982, which provides for five different amending formulae. Amendments can be brought forward under section 46(1) by any province or the federal legislature. The general formula set out in section 38(1), known as the "7/50 formula", requires: (a) assent from both the House of Commons and the Senate; (b) the approval of two-thirds of the provincial legislatures (at least seven provinces) representing at least 50 per cent of the population of the provinces (effectively, this would include at least Quebec or Ontario, as they account for more than half of the population of Canada). This formula specifically applies to amendments related to the proportionate representation in Parliament, powers, selection, and composition of the Senate, the Supreme Court, and the addition of provinces or territories.

The other amendment formulae are for particular cases as provided by the act. An amendment related to the Office of the King, the use of either official language (subject to section 43), the amending formula itself, or the composition of the Supreme Court, must be adopted by unanimous consent of all the provinces in accordance with section 41. In the case of an amendment related to provincial boundaries or the use of an official language within a province alone, the amendment must be passed by the legislatures affected by the amendment (section 43). In the case of an amendment that affects the federal government only, the amendment does not need the approval of the provinces (section 44). Similarly, amendments affecting a provincial government alone (section 45) do not need the approval of the Parliament or the other provinces.

== Sources of the constitution ==
Canada's constitution has roots going back to the thirteenth century, including England's Magna Carta and the first English Parliament of 1275. Canada's constitution is composed of several individual statutes. There are three general methods by which a statute becomes entrenched in the Constitution:

1. Specific mention as a constitutional document in section 52(2) of the Constitution Act, 1982 (e.g., the Constitution Act, 1867).
2. Constitutional entrenchment of an otherwise statutory English, British, or Canadian document because its (still in force) subject-matter provisions are explicitly assigned to one of the methods of the amending formula (per the Constitution Act, 1982)—e.g., provisions with regard to the monarchy in the English Bill of Rights 1689 or the Act of Settlement 1701.
  English and British statutes are part of Canadian law because of the Colonial Laws Validity Act 1865; section 129 of the Constitution Act, 1867; and the Statute of Westminster 1931. If still at least partially unrepealed those laws then became entrenched when the amending formula was made part of the constitution.
3. Reference by an entrenched document—e.g., the Preamble of the Constitution Act, 1867's entrenchment of written and unwritten principles from the constitution of the United Kingdom or the Constitution Act, 1982's reference to the Proclamation of 1763.
  Crucially, this includes Aboriginal rights and Crown treaties with particular First Nations (e.g., historic "numbered" treaties; modern land-claims agreements).

=== Unwritten or uncodified sources ===
The existence of unwritten constitutional components was reaffirmed in 1998 by the Supreme Court in Reference re Secession of Quebec.

The Constitution is more than a written text. It embraces the entire global system of rules and principles which govern the exercise of constitutional authority. A superficial reading of selected provisions of the written constitutional enactment, without more, may be misleading.

In practice, there have been three sources of unwritten constitutional law:

Conventions
Constitutional conventions form part of the constitution, but they are not judicially enforceable. They include the existence of the office of prime minister and the Cabinet, the practice that the Crown in most circumstances is required to grant royal assent to bills adopted by both houses of Parliament, and the requirement that the prime minister either resign or request a dissolution and general election upon losing a vote of confidence in the House of Commons.
Royal prerogative
Reserve powers of the Canadian Crown, being remnants of the powers once held by the British Crown, reduced over time by the parliamentary system. Primarily, these are the orders in council, which give the government the authority to declare war, conclude treaties, issue passports, make appointments, make regulations, incorporate, and receive lands that escheat to the Crown.
Unwritten principles
Principles that are incorporated into the Canadian constitution by the preamble of the Constitution Act, 1867, including a statement that the constitution is "similar in Principle to that of the United Kingdom", much of which is unwritten. Unlike conventions, they can give rise to substantive legal obligations in some circumstances. The Supreme Court has described unwritten principles as having two roles: aiding in the interpretation of constitutional provisions, and in developing structural doctrines that are unstated in the written Constitution but arise by the necessary implications of its architecture. Unwritten principles cannot serve as an independent basis to invalidate legislation. Amongst the principles most recognized as constitutional to date are federalism, liberal democracy, constitutionalism, the rule of law, and respect for minorities. Others include responsible government, representation by population, judicial independence, and parliamentary supremacy.

== Provincial constitutions ==
Unlike in most federations, Canadian provinces do not have written provincial constitutions. Provincial constitutions are instead a combination of uncodified constitution, provisions of the Constitution of Canada, and provincial statutes.

Overall structures of provincial governments (like the legislature and cabinet) are described in parts of the Constitution of Canada. Governmental structure of the original four provinces (Nova Scotia, New Brunswick, Quebec, and Ontario) is described in Part V of the Constitution Act, 1867. The three colonies that joined Canada after Confederation (British Columbia, Prince Edward Island, and Newfoundland and Labrador) had existing UK legislation which described their governmental structure, and this was affirmed in each colony's Terms of Union, which now form part of Canada's Constitution. The remaining three provinces (Manitoba, Saskatchewan, and Alberta) were created by federal statute. Their constitutional structures are described in those statutes, which now form part of Canada's Constitution.

All provinces have enacted legislation that establishes other rules for the structure of government. For example, every province (and territory) has an act governing elections to the legislature, and another governing procedure in the legislature. Two provinces have explicitly listed such acts as being part of their provincial constitution; see Constitution of Quebec and Constitution Act (British Columbia). However, these acts do not, generally, supersede other legislation and do not require special procedures to amend, and so they function as regular statutes rather than constitutional statutes.

A small number of non-constitutional provincial laws do supersede all other provincial legislation, as a constitution would. This is referred to as quasi-constitutionality. Quasi-constitutionality is often applied to human rights laws, allowing those laws to act as a de facto constitutional charter of rights. For example, laws preventing discrimination in employment, housing, and services have clauses making them quasi-constitutional in ten of thirteen jurisdictions.

=== Amending provincial constitutions ===
Section 45 of the Constitution Act, 1982 allows each province to amend its own constitution. This applies, for example, to provincial statute laws like Constitution of Quebec and Constitution Act (British Columbia). However, if the desired change would require an amendment to any documents that form part of the Constitution of Canada, it would require the consent of the Senate and House of Commons under section 43. This was done, for example, by the Constitution Amendment, 1998, when Newfoundland asked the federal government to amend the Terms of Union of Newfoundland to allow it to end denominational quotas for religion classes.

A small number of statutes within provincial constitutions cannot be amended by a simple majority of the legislative assembly, despite section 45. For example, section 7 of the Constitution of Alberta Amendment Act, 1990 requires plebiscites of Métis settlement members before that act can be amended. Courts have not yet ruled about whether this kind of language really would bind future legislatures, but it might do so if the higher bar was met when creating the law.

Three amendments to provincial constitutions in the 2020s have been controversially framed as amendments to the Constitution Act 1867. These are Quebec statutes purporting to add sections 90Q and 128Q and a Saskatchewan statute purporting to add section 90S. Because the Senate and House of Commons did not authorize these amendments, they would only have effect if they are amendments to provincial constitutions under the section 45 amending procedure. Constitutional scholars are divided on the validity of an amendment to a provincial constitution framed as an addition to part of the Constitution of Canada.

== Vandalism of the proclamation paper ==
In 1983, Peter Greyson, an art student, entered Ottawa's National Archives (known today as Library and Archives Canada) and poured red paint mixed with glue over a copy of the proclamation of the 1982 constitutional amendment. He said he was displeased with the federal government's decision to allow United States missile testing in Canada and had wanted to "graphically illustrate to Canadians" how wrong he believed the government to be. Greyson was charged with public mischief and sentenced to 89 days in jail, 100 hours of community work, and two years of probation. A grapefruit-sized stain remains on the original document; restoration specialists opted to leave most of the paint intact, fearing that removal attempts would only cause further damage.

== See also ==
- Canadian values
- Constitutionalism
