= Cabinet committee =

Cabinet committee may refer to:

- Cabinet committee (Canada)
- Cabinet committee on security (India)
- Cabinet committee on political affairs (India)
- Cabinet committee on national security (Pakistan)
- Cabinet committee (United Kingdom)

== See also ==
- Ministerial committee
