= Quasi-constitutionality =

In Canada, the term quasi-constitutional is used for laws which remain paramount even when subsequent statutes, which contradict them, are enacted by the same legislature. This is the reverse of the normal practice, under which newer laws trump any contradictory provisions in any older statute.

== Primacy clauses in quasi-constitutional statutes ==
The normal practice, under which the more recent statute has the effect of nullifying any contradictory rules laid out in all earlier statutes, is known as "implied repeal." Implied repeal is the traditional way of ensuring that two contradictory laws are never in effect at the same time. The practice of implied repeal also reinforces the concept of parliamentary sovereignty or supremacy---that is, it reinforces the idea that the parliament or legislature cannot be restricted by any external limit, including past actions of the legislature itself.

A quasi-constitutional statute uses a "primacy clause" to achieve the apparently contradictory goals of respecting parliamentary sovereignty whilst retaining primacy in the face of later, contradictory statutes. A primacy clause is a provision stating that the statute can only be repealed or limited by a later statute if that later statute contains a primacy clause of its own, specifically stating that the new law is overriding the earlier, quasi-constitutional statute. For example, subsection 1(1) of the Alberta Human Rights Act reads "Unless it is expressly declared by an Act of the Legislature that it operates notwithstanding this Act, every law of Alberta is inoperative to the extent that it authorizes or requires the doing of anything prohibited by this Act." The human rights codes of some other provinces use similar language.

Canadian constitutional scholar Peter Hogg provides this summary:

In Canadian statutes, it is not uncommon to find "primacy clauses" that purport to declare that the statute containing the clause is supreme over other statutes, future as well as past. Such clauses are intended to defeat the doctrine of implied repeal, under which a later statute would impliedly repeal an inconsistent earlier statute to the extent of the inconsistency.

A quasi-constitutional law may be repealed or amended by means of an ordinary Act of the parliament or legislature, just like any other law. In this respect, therefore, such laws are not genuinely constitutional laws, which normally require some higher form of approval, such as the approval of multiple provincial legislatures, in order to be amended.

== Examples ==
At the federal level, such laws include the Canadian Bill of Rights and the Official Languages Act. In Quebec, the Charter of the French Language and the Quebec Charter of Human Rights and Freedoms contain primacy clauses asserting quasi-constitutional status.

The primacy clause in the Canadian Bill of Rights asserts that no later provision of a later statute, which contradicts the Bill of Rights may prevail unless "it is expressly declared ... that it shall operate notwithstanding the Canadian Bill of Rights." The Quebec Charter of Human Rights and Freedoms states that contradictory acts do not apply "unless such Act expressly states that it applies despite the Charter."

Similarly, subsection 82(1) of the Official Languages Act states that "in the event of any inconsistency" between Parts I - V of that Act, and any part of any later Act of Parliament, the provisions of the Official Languages Act will prevail.

== Origin of the term "quasi-constitutional" ==
The first Canadian law to establish a claim to quasi-constitutional status was the Interpretation Act, which was enacted in November 1867 at the first session of the Parliament of Canada. Section 3 of this law stated:

This section and the fourth, fifth, sixth, seventh and eighth sections of this Act, and each provision thereof, shall extend and apply to every Act passed in the Session held in this thirtieth Year of Her Majesty's Reign, and in any future Session of the Parliament of Canada, except in so far as the provision is inconsistent with the intent and object of such Act, or the interpretation which such provision would give to any word, expression or clause is inconsistent with the context,—and except in so far as any provision thereof is in any such Act declared not applicable thereto;—Nor shall the omission in any Act of a declaration that the "Interpretation Act" shall apply thereto, be construed to prevent its so applying, although such express declaration may be inserted in some other Act or Acts of the same Session.

However, the term "quasi-constitutional" was not coined until 1974. The term was invented in a dissenting opinion written by Bora Laskin, a future Chief Justice of Canada. Laskin observed, "The Canadian Bill of Rights is a half-way house between a purely common law regime and a constitutional one; it may aptly be described as a quasi-constitutional instrument."

Lamer's dissent prompted the then-Chief Justice, Roland Ritchie, to offer this concise summary as to the practical implications of a primacy clause being taken at face value—that is, when a primacy clause is not simply ignored by the courts: "[Justice Laskin] characterizes the Canadian Bill of Rights as a "quasi constitutional instrument" by which I take him to mean that its provisions are to be construed and applied as if they were constitutional provisions...."

== Court-established quasi-constitutionality ==
Laws acquire quasi-constitutional status either by means of a provision in their text, or through court interpretation as such.

== Interpretation of quasi-constitutional laws ==
The Supreme Court of Canada has held repeatedly that quasi-constitutional statutes are to be interpreted using the same principles of statutory interpretation as are employed for all other statutes. A quasi-constitutional statute must, like any other statute, be interpreted purposively. This means that conflicts in interpretation should be resolved in favour of the underlying purposes of the Act. Additionally, when the quasi-constitutional law is a rights-protecting measure such as a human rights act, the protected rights are to be interpreted broadly and exceptions and the limitations on these rights are to be construed narrowly.

In 2008 the Court ruled, in New Brunswick (Human Rights Commission) v. Potash Corporation of Saskatchewan Inc.:

[H]uman rights legislation must be interpreted in accordance with its quasi-constitutional status. This means that ambiguous language must be interpreted in a way that best reflects the remedial goals of the statute. It does not, however, permit interpretations which are inconsistent with the wording of the legislation.

This ruling was consistent with an earlier decision, in which the Court stated:

"[Quasi-constitutional] status does not operate to alter the traditional approach to the interpretation of legislation, 'Today there is only one principle or approach, namely, the words of an Act are to be read in their entire context and in their grammatical and ordinary sense harmoniously with the scheme of the Act, the object of the Act, and the intention of Parliament.'"

== Implications of quasi-constitutional laws ==
Quasi-constitutional laws are considered "more important than other laws," and are therefore paramount to, or supersede, laws enacted before or after. The effect of paramountcy is to render the conflicting law inoperative as to the conflict.

== How a primacy clause may be overridden ==
A quasi-constitutional law may not be used to invalidate the provisions of any later statute that contains a provision stating that this new law applies notwithstanding the quasi-constitutional law.

For example, section 2 of the Canadian Bill of Rights, a quasi-constitutional law states:

Every law of Canada shall, unless it is expressly declared by an Act of the Parliament of Canada that it shall operate notwithstanding the Canadian Bill of Rights, be so construed and applied as not to abrogate, abridge or infringe or to authorize the abrogation, abridgment or infringement of any of the rights or freedoms herein recognized and declared....

Section 12 of the Public Order Temporary Measures Act, which was enacted on November 2, 1970, at the height of the October Crisis, overrode the Canadian Bill of Rights by stating, "It is hereby declared that this act shall operate notwithstanding the Canadian Bill of Rights."

The Public Order Temporary Measures Act is the only law that has ever overridden the Canadian Bill of Rights by means of such a clause—and moreover, the law contained further provisions ensuring that only some of the rights protected under the Bill of Rights would be suspended. As a further protection, the Public Order Temporary Measures Act contained a sunset clause causing these restrictions to expire within six months.

== Conflicts between quasi-constitutional laws ==
One implication of the creation of a special class of quasi-constitutional laws is that on some occasions, one law which has been declared to be quasi-constitutional may contradict a provision of another quasi-constitutional law. In such cases, it is not immediately clear which law should prevail. In order to provide clarity, some quasi-constitutional laws contain provisions outlining which law will take priority. For example, subsection 82(2) of the Official Languages Act states that this Act's quasi-constitutional priority status "does not apply to the Canadian Human Rights Act or any regulation made thereunder."

== Examples of quasi-constitutional laws and principles in Canada ==
- Quebec Charter
- Human Rights Legislation
- Official Languages Act
- Privacy Act
- Canadian Bill of Rights
- Access to Information Act
- Freedom of Expression (prior to gaining constitutional status when enacted in the Charter)

== See also ==
- Obrogation
- Unconstitutionality
