= Canadian privacy law =

Privacy law in Canada

Canadian privacy law is derived from the common law, statutes of the Parliament of Canada and the various provincial legislatures, and the Canadian Charter of Rights and Freedoms.

== Evolution of Canadian privacy statutes ==
Canadian privacy law has evolved over time into what it is today. The first instance of a formal law came when, in 1977, the Canadian government introduced data protection provisions into the Canadian Human Rights Act. In 1982, the Canadian Charter of Rights and Freedoms outlined that everyone has "the right to life, liberty and security of the person" and "the right to be free from unreasonable search or seizure", but did not directly mention the concept of privacy. In 1983, the federal Privacy Act regulated how federal government collects, uses and discloses personal information. Canadians' constitutional right to privacy was further confirmed in the 1984 Supreme Court case, Hunter v. Southam. In this case, Section 8 of the Canadian Charter of Rights and Freedoms (1982) was found "to protect individuals from unjustified state intrusions upon their privacy" and the court stated such Charter rights should be interpreted broadly. Later, in a 1988 Supreme Court case, the right to privacy was established as "an essential component of individual freedom". The court report from R. v. Dyment states, "From the earliest stage of Charter interpretation, this Court has made it clear that the rights it guarantees [including privacy rights] must be interpreted generously, and not in a narrow or legalistic fashion". Throughout the late 1990s and 2000s, privacy legislation placed restrictions on the collection, use and disclosure of information by provincial and territorial governments and by companies and institutions in the private sector.

=== Governing relations with public sector institutions ===
==== Privacy Act ====
The Privacy Act, passed in 1983 by the Parliament of Canada, regulates how federal government institutions collect, use and disclose personal information. It also provides individuals with a right of access to information held about them by the federal government, and a right to request correction of any erroneous information.

The Act established the office of the Privacy Commissioner of Canada, who is an Officer of Parliament. The responsibilities of the Privacy Commissioner includes supervising the application of the Act itself.

Under the Act, the Privacy Commissioner has powers to audit federal government institutions to ensure their compliance with the act, and is obliged to investigate complaints by individuals about breaches of the act. The Act and its equivalent legislation in most provinces are the expression of internationally accepted principles known as "fair information practices." As a last resort, the Privacy Commissioner of Canada does have the "power of embarrassment", which can be used in the hopes that the party being embarrassed will rectify the problem under public scrutiny

Although the office of the commissioner has no mandate to conduct extensive research and education under the current Privacy Act, the Commissioner believed that he had become a leading educator in Canada on the issue of privacy.

==== Access to Information Act ====
The next major change to the Canadian privacy laws came in 1985 in the form of the Access to Information Act. The main purposes of the Act were to provide citizens with the right of access to information under the control of governmental institutions. The Act limits access to personal information under specific circumstances.

==== Freedom of Information Act ====
The Freedom of Information Act was enacted in 1996, and expanded upon the principles of the Privacy Act and Access to Information Act. It was designed to make governmental institutions more accountable to the public, and to protect individual privacy by giving the public right of access to records, as well as giving individuals right of access to and a right to request correction of personal information about themselves. It also specifies limits to the rights of access given to individuals, prevents the unauthorized collection, use or disclosure of personal information by public bodies, and redefines the role of the Privacy Commissioner of Canada.

=== Extension to private sector organizations ===
==== Federal ====
The Personal Information Protection and Electronic Documents Act ("PIPEDA") governs the topic of data privacy, and how private-sector companies can collect, use and disclose personal information. The Act also contains various provisions to facilitate the use of electronic documents. PIPEDA was passed in 2000 to promote consumer trust in electronic commerce, as well as was intended to assure that Canadian privacy laws protect the personal information of citizens of other nationalities to be in compliance with EU data protection law. In recent years, there have been numerous calls for reform as PIPEDA is considered outdated and unable to address AI effectively. The Canadian government responded with a comprehensive reform project under Parliamentary discussion.

PIPEDA includes and creates provisions of the Canadian Standards Association's Model Code for the Protection of Personal Information, developed in 1995. Like any privacy protection act, the individual must be informed of information that may be disclosed, whereby consent is given. This may be done through accepting terms, signing a document or verbal communication.

In PIPEDA, "Personal Information" is specified as information about an identifiable individual, which includes both collected information and inferred information about individuals.

==== Provinces ====
PIPEDA allows for similar provincial laws to continue to be in effect. Quebec, British Columbia and Alberta have subsequently been determined to have similar legislation, and laws governing personal health information only, in Ontario and New Brunswick, have received similar recognition. They all govern:

- What personal information can be collected from individuals (including customers, clients and employees);
- When consent is required to collect personal information and how consent is obtained;
- What notice must be provided before personal information is collected, and
- How personal information may be used or disclosed;
- The purposes for which personal information may be collected, used or disclosed by the organization;
- How an individual may get access to and request correction of his or her personal information held by the organization.

Certain provincial acts that have been so recognized, and agencies responsible, are noted below:

Province	Act	Federal recognition	Provincial regulator
British Columbia	Personal Information Protection Act, S.B.C. 2003, c. 63	(Note: Organizations in the Province of British Columbia Exemption Order, SOR/2004-220)	Office of the Information and Privacy Commissioner for British Columbia
British Columbia	E-Health (Personal Health Information Access and Protection of Privacy) Act, S.B.C. 2008, c. 38	(Note: Organizations in the Province of British Columbia Exemption Order, SOR/2004-220)	Office of the Information and Privacy Commissioner for British Columbia
Alberta	Personal Information Protection Act, S.A. 2003, c. P-6.5	(Note: Organizations in the Province of Alberta Exemption Order, SOR/2004-219)	Office of the Information and Privacy Commissioner of Alberta
Alberta	Health Information Act, R.S.A. 2000, c. H-5	(Note: Organizations in the Province of Alberta Exemption Order, SOR/2004-219)	Office of the Information and Privacy Commissioner of Alberta
Nova Scotia	Personal Health Information Act, S.N.S. 2010, c. 41	Personal Health Information Custodians in Nova Scotia Exemption Order, SOR/2016-62,(deemed substantially similar to Part 1 of Personal Information Protection and Electronic Documents Act)	Office of the Information and Privacy Commissioner for Nova Scotia
Ontario	Personal Health Information Protection Act, 2004, S.O. 2004, c. 3, Schedule A	Health Information Custodians in the Province of Ontario Exemption Order, SOR/2005-399	Information and Privacy Commissioner of Ontario
Quebec	An Act respecting the protection of personal information in the private sector,R.S.Q., c. P-39.1	(Note: Organizations in the Province of Quebec Exemption Order, SOR/2003-374)	Commission d'accès à l'information du Québec
New Brunswick	Personal Health Information Privacy and Access Act, S.N.B. 2009, c. P-7.05	Personal Health Information Custodians in New Brunswick Exemption Order, SOR/2011-265	Office of the Access to Information and Privacy Commissioner
Newfoundland and Labrador	Personal Health Information Act(PHIA), S.N.L. 2008, c. P-7.01	Personal Health Information Custodians in Newfoundland and Labrador Exemption Order, S.I./2012-72 (only in relation to personal health information custodians)	Office of the Information and Privacy Commissioner of Newfoundland and Labrador
Saskatchewan	Health Information Protection Act, S.S. 1999, c. H-0.021		Office of the Saskatchewan Information and Privacy Commissioner
Saskatchewan	Data Matching Agreements Act, S.S. 2018, c. D-1.3		Office of the Saskatchewan Information and Privacy Commissioner
Manitoba	Personal Health Information Act, C.C.S.M. c. P125		Manitoba Ombudsman (privacy commissioner)
Prince Edward Island	Health Information Act, R.S.P.E.I. 1988, c. H-1.41		Information and Privacy Commissioner for Prince Edward Island
Northwest Territories	Health Information Act, S.N.W.T. 2014, c. 2		Information and Privacy Commissioner of the Northwest Territories
Yukon	Health Information Privacy and Management Act, S.Y. 2013, c. 16		Yukon Information and Privacy Commissioner
Nunavut			Office of the Information and Privacy Commissioner of Nunavut

== Development of personal privacy rights ==
=== Provincial statutes ===
The Civil Code of Quebec contains provisions governing privacy rights that can be enforced in the courts. In addition, the following provinces have passed similar statutes:

- British Columbia
- Saskatchewan
- Manitoba
- Newfoundland and Labrador

All four Acts establish a limited right of action, whereby liability will only be found if the defendant acts wilfully (not a requirement in Manitoba) and without a claim of right. Moreover, the nature and degree of the plaintiff‟s privacy entitlement is circumscribed by what is "reasonable in the circumstances".

=== Evolution of the common law ===
In January 2012, the Ontario Court of Appeal declared that the common law in Canada recognizes a right to personal privacy, more specifically identified as a "tort of intrusion upon seclusion", as well as considering that appropriation of personality is already recognized as a tort in Ontario law. The ramifications of this decision are just beginning to be discussed.

== See also ==
- Information privacy law
- Law in Canada
- Privacy laws of the United States
- Privacy law
- R v Cole—privacy for personal use of workplace computers (where permitted or reasonably expected)
