= Info Source =

Info Source is a Government of Canada agency repository of information about or collected by the Canadian government. The purpose of Info Source is to help Canadians to access information available through the Privacy Act and the Access to Information Act. Requests made under the Access to Information Act and the Privacy Act must be sent to the Access to Information and Privacy Coordinator at the institution which holds the information. The database is overseen by the Treasury Board Secretariat.
