= Freedom of Information and Protection of Privacy Act (Ontario) =

Ontario, Canada statute

Legislative Assembly of Ontario
- Citation: Freedom of Information and Protection of Privacy Act, R.S.O. 1990, c. F.31, s. 1
- Territorial extent: Province of Ontario
- Commenced: 1 January 1988
- Status: In force

The Freedom of Information and Protection of Privacy Act (French: Loi sur l’accès à l’information et la protection de la vie privée, R.S.O. 1990, c. F.31) (commonly abbreviated FIPPA) (the Act) is an Act of the Legislative Assembly of Ontario. The Act legislates access to information held by public institutions in Ontario subject to specific requirements to safeguard the personal information of individuals.

== History ==
In 1977, the Williams Commission was convened with a mandate from Ontario's Attorney General to report on public information policies of the Government of Ontario. The Commission presented recommendations to the provincial legislature in August, 1980.

After the long-standing Progressive Conservative government was defeated in 1985, the Liberal party established a minority government with the support of the New Democratic Party (NDP). One of the conditions for the NDP's support was passage of Bill 34, legislation which would establish new freedom of information and privacy protection law, and which relied on the recommendations of the Williams Commission. Bill 34 was originally introduced in July, 1985 and referred for public consultations between March 1986 and May 1987.

The resulting Act came into effect on January 1, 1988.

== See also ==
- Freedom of information in Canada
- Personal Information Protection and Electronic Documents Act
