= Common Look and Feel =

The Government of Canada's Common Look and Feel (CLF) Standards for the Internet governed the branding, usability & accessibility standards for its websites and web applications from 2000 - 2010. It comprised the following four parts, now rescinded:

- Part 1: Standard on Web Addresses- i.e. tbs-sct.gc.ca
- Part 2: Standard on the Accessibility, Interoperability and Usability of Web sites - coding practices for accessibility
- Part 3: Standard on Common Web Page Formats – to create a common look and feel of Web pages so that they could be easily identified as belonging to the Government of Canada
- Part 4: Standard on Email – for consistent identification of government employees

== Government of Canada Web Standards ==
The Common Look and Feel (CLF) Standards for the Internet have been replaced with four Web Standards that incorporate current web practices such as WCAG 2.0, as well as designing for a plethora of devices, browsers and assistive technologies through which people navigate the Web.

As of 2014, the Government of Canada Web Standards consist of the following four mandatory policies:

- Standard on Web Accessibility (in effect: August 1, 2011)
- Standard on Web Usability (in effect: September 28, 2011)
- Standard on Web Interoperability (in effect: July 1, 2012)
- Standard on Optimizing Websites and Applications for Mobile Devices (in effect: April 1, 2013)

== History ==
In 2000, the Canadian CLF 1.0 standard was implemented and government departments had almost two years to make their sites compliant.

In 2007, the Canadian CLF standard was revised and a 2.0 version was released. Government of Canada organizations were given two years to comply.

In 2010, the Treasury Board of Canada Secretariat announced that CLF 2.0 would be replaced by four Web Standards to:

- take into account the most recent version of internationally accepted Web content accessibility guidelines;
- increase flexibility of Website layout and design;
- enable institutions to incorporate the use of innovative and emerging technologies to their online information and services.

With various concerns having been raised over problems created by the CLF requirements, future versions of the standard may see significant changes.
