= Freedom of Information and Protection of Privacy Act (Alberta) =

Alberta, Canada statute

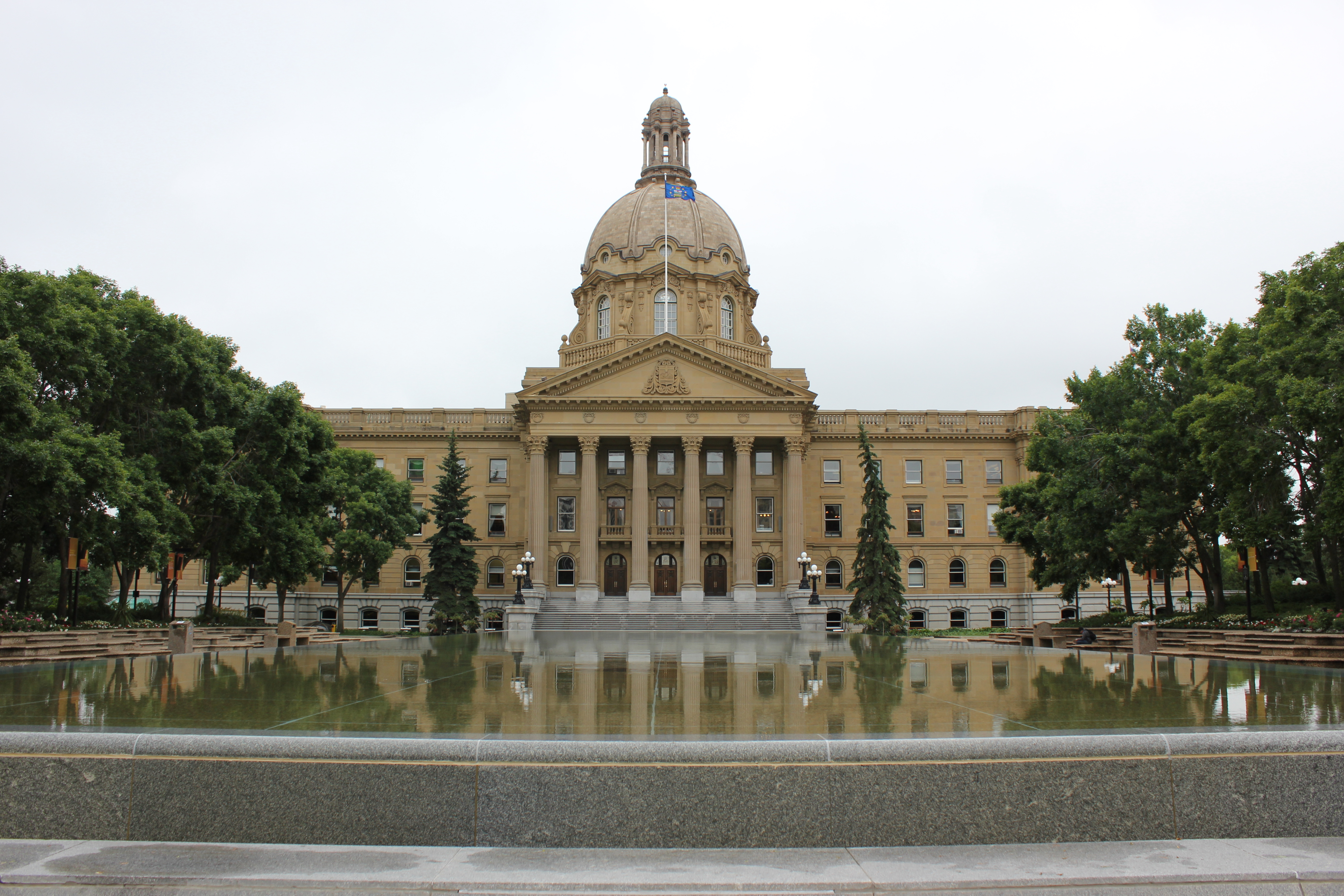

Legislative Assembly of Alberta
- Citation: Freedom of Information and Protection of Privacy Act, R.S.O. 1990, c. F.31, s. 1
- Territorial extent: Province of Alberta
- Commenced: June 1994
- Status: In force

The Freedom of Information and Protection of Privacy Act, RSA 2000, c F-25 (FOIP Act) is the freedom of information and privacy act for Alberta, Canada. It was passed by the Alberta legislature in June 1994 and came into force on October 1, 1995.

== Purpose ==
"Purposes of this Act

2 The purposes of this Act are

(a) to allow any person a right of access to the records in the custody or under the control of a public body subject to limited and specific exceptions as set out in this Act,

(b) to control the manner in which a public body may collect personal information from individuals, to control the use that a public body may make of that information and to control the disclosure by a public body of that information,

(c) to allow individuals, subject to limited and specific exceptions as set out in this Act, a right of access to personal information about themselves that is held by a public body,

(d) to allow individuals a right to request corrections to personal information about themselves that is held by a public body, and

(e) to provide for independent reviews of decisions made by public bodies under this Act and the resolution of complaints under this Act."

— 1994 cF‑18.5 s2;1995 c17 s3

== History ==
In 2002, there were 62 changes made to the Act. This included amendments, references and potential changes to other acts such as the Traffic Safety Act, Vital Statistics Act, Election Act, Health Information Act, Mines and Minerals Act, Electronic Transactions Act, Occupational Health and Safety Act and the Municipal Government Act. The amendments recommended, that Alberta Energy "consider the protection of information provided in support of oil sands royalty calculations" the next time the Mines and Minerals Act is opened."

== See also ==
- Freedom of information in Canada
- Personal Information Protection and Electronic Documents Act
