= Cabinet committee (Canada) =

Senior government group

The Government of Canada is directed by the Cabinet, a group of senior government ministers led by the Prime Minister. Cabinet committees are a set of committees in the ministry that are responsible for enacting their agenda.

When the Prime Minister is unable to attend Cabinet or the chair and any vice-chair of a Cabinet committee are absent, the next most senior minister in the ministerial ranking should take the chair. Committee membership is limited to ministers, but non-ministers may attend in some cases.

== Current committees ==
Members of the following cabinet committees are from the 30th Canadian Ministry, headed by Mark Carney as prime minister since March 2025.

| Name | Chair | Vice-Chair | Terms of reference |
|---|---|---|---|
| National Security Council | Mark Carney, Prime Minister | Anita Anand, Minister of Foreign Affairs | To consider matters relating to national security, foreign policy, defence, trade strategy, international relations, development, resilience and resource security. |
| Treasury Board | Shafqat Ali, President of the Treasury Board | François-Philippe Champagne, Minister of Finance and National Revenue | To consider matters relating to government digitization, the public service, and public funds. Has alternate members. |
| Priorities, Planning and Strategy | Mark Carney, Prime Minister | Steven MacKinnon, Leader of the Government in the House of Commons of Canada | To consider matters relating to government strategy and legislation implementation. |
| Operations and Parliamentary Affairs | Dominic LeBlanc, Minister responsible for Canada-U.S. Trade, Intergovernmental Affairs, One Canadian Economy, and President of the King's Privy Council for Canada | Steven MacKinnon, Leader of the Government in the House of Commons of Canada | To consider matters relating to parliamentary affairs and emerging issues. |
| Build Canada | Tim Hodgson, Minister of Energy and Natural Resources | Chrystia Freeland, Minister of Transport and Internal Trade | To consider matters relating to housing, infrastructure, climate change, the economy, and Indigenous prosperity. |
| Government Transformation / Government Efficiency | François-Philippe Champagne, Minister of Finance and National Revenue | Joël Lightbound, Minister of Government Transformation, Public Works and Procurement | To consider matters relating to government delivery and the reduction of its expenditures. |
| Secure and Sovereign Canada | David McGuinty, Minister of National Defence | Anita Anand, Minister of Foreign Affairs | To consider matters relating to Canada-U.S. relations, Canadian sovereignty, and foreign affairs. |
| Quality of Life and Well-Being | Steven Guilbeault, Minister of Canadian Identity and Culture | Julie Dabrusin, Minister of Environment and Climate Change | To consider matters relating to safety, Indigenous relations, and community. |
| Incident Response Group | Mark Carney, Prime Minister | | Only activated to respond to a national crisis or threat. Eleanor Olszewski, the Minister of Emergency Management and Community Resilience, serves as a "core member". |

== Former committees ==
- Cabinet Committee on Security, Public Health and Emergencies, established under the Martin government

The following were included in the Trudeau government, between 2015 and 2025:

- Agenda, Results and Communication Cabinet Committee
- Canada in the World & Public Security Cabinet Committee
- Canada-United States Relations Cabinet Committee
- Defence Procurement Cabinet Committee
- Diversity and Inclusion Cabinet Committee
- Environment, Climate Change and Energy Cabinet Committee
- Growing the Middle Class Cabinet Committee
- Litigation Management Cabinet Committee
