= Treasury Board of Canada Secretariat =

Canadian government agency

- Secrétariat du Conseil du Trésor du Canada

Department overview
- Jurisdiction: Government of Canada
- Headquarters: James Michael Flaherty Building, Ottawa, Ontario, Canada
- Minister responsible: Shafqat Ali, President of the Treasury Board
- Deputy Minister responsible: Bill Matthews, Secretary of the Treasury Board
- Parent department: Treasury Board
- Website: www.tbs-sct.gc.ca

The Treasury Board of Canada Secretariat (TBS; French: Secrétariat du Conseil du Trésor du Canada, SCT) is the administrative branch of the Treasury Board of Canada (the committee of ministers responsible for the financial management of the federal government) and a central agency of the Government of Canada. The role of the Secretariat is to support the Treasury Board and to provide advice to Treasury Board members in the management and administration of the government.

The Treasury Board Secretariat is headed by the secretary of the Treasury Board, currently Bill Matthews, who is responsible to Parliament through the president of the Treasury Board, currently Shafqat Ali.

== Function ==
The TBS assists the Treasury Board, which functions as the government's management committee by overseeing the operations of the federal government as a whole and serving as the principal employer of the core public administration. The TBS is also responsible for supporting the Treasury Board in its comptrollership role, providing oversight of the financial management functions in departments and agencies.

TBS offices are located primarily at 90 Elgin Street, Ottawa, Ontario, though there are several smaller offices elsewhere in Ottawa/Gatineau, as well as regional offices throughout Canada.

== Secretary ==
In May 2024, Prime Minister Justin Trudeau announced that Bill Matthews was to become Secretary of the Treasury Board.

== Current Structure of Treasury Board Secretariat ==
- President of the Treasury Board
  - Secretary of the Treasury Board
    - Associate Secretary
    - Chief Human Resources Officer
    - Chief Information Officer, Chief Information Officer Branch
    - Comptroller General of Canada
      - Assistant Secretary, Corporate Services Sector
      - Assistant Secretary, Economic Sector
      - Assistant Secretary, Expenditure Management Sector
      - Assistant Secretary, Government Operations Sector
      - Assistant Secretary, International Affairs, Security and Justice Sector
      - Assistant Secretary, Priorities and Planning Sector
      - Assistant Secretary, Regulatory Affairs Sector
      - Assistant Secretary, Social and Cultural Sector
      - Assistant Secretary, Strategic Communications and Ministerial Affairs Sector
      - Senior Director, Internal Audit and Evaluation Bureau
      - Senior General Counsel, Legal Services Branch

The GC 2.0 Program Office in the CIO Branch of Treasury Board Secretariat is responsible for maintaining GCpedia, the Government of Canada internal wiki.

== Access to information and privacy ==
The Access to Information Act gives Canadian citizens, permanent residents, and any person or corporation present in Canada a right to access records of government institutions that are subject to the Act. The Privacy Act gives Canadian citizens, permanent residents, and individuals present in Canada the right to access their personal information held by government institutions that are subject to the Act. The Treasury Board Secretariat is responsible for issuing direction and guidance to government institutions with respect to the administration of the Access to Information Act and interpretation of this policy.
