= Office of the Chief Human Resources Officer =

The Office of the Chief Human Resources Officer (OCHRO), formerly Canada Public Service Agency, is the representative of the Government of Canada on all issues relating to human resources, pensions and benefits, labour relations and compensation. In addition it administers the Values and Ethics Code for the Public Sector, a document first written in 2003.

== Organization ==
The office is headed by the Chief Human Resources Officer, who has similar status as the Comptroller General of Canada. While housed under the Treasury Board Secretariat (TBS), its operation is independently carried out by the OCHRO and not by TBS staff. They are responsible for providing strategic enterprise-wide leadership. CHRO is also the ex officio Chair of the Board of Governors for the Canada School of Public Service.

== History ==
In a strategic review conducted by the Harper government in early 2008, it was determined HR activities can be more efficiently and effectively managed by centralizing all functions into one agency. Prior to March 2, 2009, human resources responsibility for the federal government was split between two agencies: the Canada Public Service Agency and the Treasury Board Secretariat.
