= Freedom of Information and Protection of Privacy Act (Nova Scotia) =

Law in Nova Scotia

The Freedom of Information and Protection of Privacy Act, commonly known as FOIPOP, (the Act) is the public sector privacy law and access to information law for the Province of Nova Scotia.

== History ==
Nova Scotia was the first Canadian province to enact freedom of information legislation, passing the Freedom of Information Act in 1977. In 1993, the province repealed and replaced the legislation to include personal privacy protections by enacting the Freedom of Information and Protection of Privacy Act, which came into force in 1994.

== Overview ==
The Act is generally considered to be in two parts: the first dealing with access to records in the custody or control of public bodies and the second dealing with the regulation of the collection, use and disclosure of personal information by those public bodies. It applies to provincially regulated public bodies in the province of Nova Scotia. "Public body" is defined in section 3(1)(j) of the Act, and generally means provincial government departments, agencies, boards, commissions, some crown corporations, public universities, school boards, and hospitals. It also specifically includes those organizations listed in the Schedule to the Act.

== Administration ==
FOIPOP is administered by the Review Officer appointed under section 33 of the Act. The Review Officer serves as an ombudsman, reviewing complaints brought by individuals seeking access to records held by public bodies. The Review Officer does not have specific order-making powers and the powers of that office are limited with respect to privacy complaints. Complaints can be taken to the Supreme Court of Nova Scotia after having been dealt with by the Review Officer.
