= Access to Information Act =

Canadian freedom of information act

Parliament of Canada
- Long title: An Act to extend the present laws of Canada that provide access to information under the control of the Government of Canada
- Citation: Access to Information Act (R.S.C., 1985, c. A-1), last amended on 2021-08-12
- Enacted by: 33rd Canadian Parliament
- Assented to: 1985

The Access to Information Act (R.S., 1985, c. A-1) (French: Loi sur l'accès à l'information) or Information Act is a Canadian Act providing the right of access to information under the control of a federal government institution. As of 2020, the Act allowed "people who pay $5 to request an array of federal files". Paragraph 2. (1) of the Act ("Purpose") declares that government information should be available to the public, but with necessary exceptions to the right of access that should be limited and specific, and that decisions on the disclosure of government information should be reviewed independently of government. Later paragraphs assign responsibility for this review to an Information Commissioner, who reports directly to parliament rather than the government in power. However, the Act provides the commissioner the power only to recommend rather than compel the release of requested information that the commissioner judges to be not subject to any exception specified in the Act.

== History ==
By 1982, Australia, Denmark, the Netherlands, New Zealand, Sweden, and the U.S. (1966), had enacted modern Freedom of information legislation. Canada's Access to Information Act came into force in 1983, under the Pierre Trudeau government, permitting Canadians to retrieve information from government files, establishing what information could be accessed, mandating timelines for response. By the standards of that era, it came to be considered a model of good practice, having taken the implementation of the law more seriously than other countries. The Act created new offices staffed with trained professionals to manage the inflow of requests, and developed formal procedures to encourage prompt processing of requests. Furthermore, the Information Commissioner served as an easily accessible ombudsperson to arbitrate cases of possible maladministration.

A complementary Privacy Act also came into force in 1983. The purpose of this Act was to extend the present laws of Canada that protect the privacy of individuals with respect to personal information about themselves held by a federal government institution and that provide individuals with a right of access to that information. It is a Crown copyright. This Act stipulates that complaints about possible violations of the Act may be reported to the Privacy Commissioner.

In 1998, following the Somalia Affair, a clause was appended to the Act, making it a federal offence to destroy, falsify, or conceal public documents.

Canadian access to information laws distinguish between access to records generally and access to records that contain personal information about the person making the request. Subject to exceptions, individuals have a right of access to records that contain their own personal information under the Privacy Act but the general public does not have a right of access to records that contain personal information about others under the Access to Information Act.

From 1989 to 2008, requests made to the federal government were catalogued in the Coordination of Access to Information Requests System (CAIRS). Although CAIRS was not originally designed for public use, the information contained in the database generated substantial and continued public interest. Two non-governmental websites offered information from CAIRS to the public with a search facility. In April 2008, the Conservative government of Prime Minister Stephen Harper terminated the maintenance of this database.

== Proposed refinements ==
=== Mulroney government ===
In 1987, the Solicitor General tabled a report to Parliament with the authorship and unanimous support of a "Justice Committee" consisting of the House of Commons Standing Committee on Justice together with himself, entitled Open and Shut: Enhancing the Right to Know and the Right to Privacy. It contained over 100 recommendations for amending the ATI and Privacy Acts. Many of these dealt with exemptions from access, recommending the addition of a discretionary injury test in most cases, which would evaluate "the harm to the interest (e.g., the conduct of international affairs) that could reasonably be expected to result from disclosure". The Committee proposed that the complete exclusion of Cabinet records from the operation of the Act be deleted and replaced with an exemption that would not be subject to an injury test. This crucial change would have allowed the Information Commissioner and the Federal Court of Canada to review alleged "cabinet documents" in order to determine whether or not they are, in fact, Cabinet confidences and eligible for exemption. The government response to the report, published in 1987 by the Minister of Supply and Services and entitled "Access and Privacy: The Steps Ahead", generally supported the administrative, but not the legislative, changes proposed in the Justice Committee report. The concept of significant injury as a basis for the application of exemptions was rejected and the exemption for information received in confidence from other governments was justified on the basis that, "[t]he willingness of other governments to continue to share their information with Canada would likely be adversely affected by the lesser degree of protection which would be given if these recommendations were implemented".

=== Chretien government ===
In 2000, Information Commissioner John Grace presented his case for reform of the Act. He recognized that "while the Act has served well in enshrining the right to know, it has also come to express a single-request, often confrontational approach to providing information – an approach which is too slow and cumbersome for an information society." He made forty-three recommendations for updating the Act.

In August 2000, the Minister of Justice and the President of the Treasury Board launched a task force to review the Act. The committee's report, delivered in June 2002, entitled, Access to Information: Making it Work for Canadians, found "a crisis in information management" within the government. It made 139 recommendations for legislative, administrative and cultural reform. Nothing came of this report.

=== Martin government ===
In the fall of 2003, the Member of Parliament John Bryden attempted to initiate a comprehensive overhaul of the Act through a private members bill, Bill C-462, which died on the Order Paper with the dissolution of the 37th Parliament in May 2004. A similar bill was introduced by NDP MP Pat Martin on 7 October 2004 as Bill C-201. It met a similar fate.

In April 2005, the Minister of Justice Irwin Cotler introduced a discussion paper entitled A Comprehensive Framework for Access to Information Reform.

Later in 2005, a draft bill, entitled the Open Government Act, was tabled before the House of Commons Standing Committee on Access to Information, Privacy and Ethics. Developed by Information Commissioner John Reid at the request of the Standing Committee, the proposed act included substantial changes to the law. A primary objective was to address concerns about a "culture of secrecy" within political and bureaucratic environments. This draft bill initially received multi-party support, but not enough to result in the introduction by a government or passage in the form of either of two private member's bills based on this draft.

=== Harper government ===
Essentially this same draft bill with the same title "Open Government Act", but with the crucial addition of full order-making powers for record release, was introduced by NDP MP Pat Martin as Bill C-554 in 2008, and as Bill C-301 in 2011. The latter reached First Reading on 29 September in the first session of the 41st Parliament, and then was reinstated in the second session on 16 October 2013. As of September 2014, it remained on the Order Paper awaiting Second Reading.

In 2009, the Information Commissioner Robert Marleau appeared before the House of Commons Standing Committee on Access to Information, Privacy and Ethics. The Commissioner emphasized that "work [was] urgently needed to modernize" and strengthen the Act. He presented "a list of twelve specific recommendations that represent an important first step" to "address only the most pressing matters". (About 15 weeks later, Mr. Marleau abruptly resigned five years before his normal end of term, for "entirely personal and private" reasons. This was reported to have raised "doubts about the pace and direction of reforms to Canada's access to information laws that he was spearheading." )

On June 6, 2012, the Legal and Legislative Affairs Division of the Parliamentary Information and Research Service published a Library of Parliament Background Paper, entitled The Access to Information Act and Proposals for Reform. The purpose of the Paper was to identify the key points emerging from the major studies of the Act that had been conducted over the previous two decades, and to analyze in some detail some recent proposals concerning the reworking of the legislation. The Paper summarized eleven significant efforts within parliament and the federal government from 1987 to 2009. It then concluded by noting that the Conservative government of Stephen Harper in power in 2011−2012 had proposed to improve access to information, not by amending the Act, but rather by introducing what it called "open government" and "open data" initiatives. The Paper goes on to report that, in response, Canada's information and privacy commissioners suggested that the Action Plan on Open Government represents a missed opportunity for comprehensive reform of the Act. Information Commissioner Suzanne Legault suggested in a letter that the government recognizes and supports the relationship between open government and a modernized Act. She observed, "Our investigations in recent years have demonstrated not only the obsolescence of the statute but also a number of deficiencies in it which may well impede or hamper the development of a truly open government that is receptive to the needs of its citizens and its economy and in step with other administrations."

=== Trudeau government ===
During his Campaign in 2015, candidate Justin Trudeau, and the Liberal Party he was representing, promised to change the Access to Information Act to include the Prime Minister's and Cabinet Office within its scope. However, his first proposed change to the act in June 2017 did not include anything about either offices. Instead, the proposed changes included promises to proactively release more information than in the past. The bill did include the courts within its scope, which meant that judge's travel and hospitality expenses were now made public. Additionally, briefing binders and mandate letters were also automatically made public.

Other changes that were proposed allowed the Information Commissioner to order specific government departments to publish information. If the department does not, the case is then to be taken to federal court. Another promise made by the Liberals was to hold reviews of the Access to Information Act every 5 years at a minimum. Additionally, under the new proposal the Information Commissioner has the right to refuse to address complaints judged to be "frivolous or vexatious". Under the previous version of the bill, anyone could appeal to the Information Commissioner's office.

Most critiques of the changes to the act concerned the broken promise from the election, while most of the people defending the proposal focused on expanded proactive disclosure. Treasury Board President Scott Brison said this in defense of the government's actions:

"Expanding and putting into law proactive release of government information is an important step in meeting and reflecting the principle of open by default, which we believe is the future of government information sharing." Trudeau did promise during the election to increase the power of the Information Commissioner, which he did. But, many times in the past government's have refused the request of the Information Officer and it has led to Federal Court cases. As expected, politician's representing other parties did were not happy about the broken commitment made during the election. "They left the really big promise broken", NDP Nathan Cullent said in response to the proposal. "By excluding the ability to request information from ministers' offices and the PMO, this government falls short of meeting their campaign promise to make government 'open by default,' was how Katie Gibbs felt about the changes. Gibbs is the executive director of the group Evidence for Democracy, and she publicly supported other parts of the act, but was overall disappointed with the Liberals not living up to their election promise.

== Progressive erosion in accessibility of federal government information ==
Université de Moncton professor Donald Savoie's 2003 book, Breaking the Bargain, observes that in Canada there is a reluctance to put anything in writing, including e-mail, that might find its way into public discourse. As context, he argues that the role of bureaucracy within the Canadian political machine has never been properly defined, that the relationship between elected and permanent government officials is increasingly problematic and that the public service cannot function if it is expected to be both independent of, and subordinate to, elected officials.

In February 2005, the Canadian Newspaper Association published a report entitled In Pursuit of Meaningful Access to Information Reform: Proposals to Strengthen Canadian Democracy. The report was motivated by the increasing difficulty experienced by journalists employed by members of the Association in obtaining "information about government that they required to inform the public on matters of national interest". The report notes that "successive Information Commissioners have criticised a 'culture of secrecy' in Ottawa, in which government departments frustrate the will of Parliament with impunity." A set of twenty specific features of a revised Act were recommended, based on a set of seven "Core Principles".

In 2006, Alasdair Roberts, presently at the Suffolk University Law School and the author of several books on public affairs, presented a report entitled Two Challenges in Administration of the Access to Information Act to the Gomery Commission investigating the Sponsorship scandal in the federal government. In the context of 2006, Prof. Roberts found that "In many respects, Canadian practice [was] superior to practice under the U.S. Freedom of Information Act (FOIA), although the popular conception [was] often the reverse, and also superior to emerging practice under the more recently drafted UK FOIA". The Two Challenges that he identified were Adversarialism in the administration of the Act, and the excessively limited Scope of the Act. Regarding the former, the "balance of forces" between the "sharply opposed interests" for and against disclosure may not "be preserved over time; one side may prove more skilled at developing new strategies than the other. Evidence suggests that federal institutions have developed techniques for managing politically sensitive requests which now undercut basic principles of the ATIA." These techniques were observed to result in substantial delays in processing information requests perceived to be politically sensitive, possibly because they originated from journalists. Prof. Roberts observed that "such delays suggest that a basic principle of the ATIA is widely and routinely flouted by federal institutions. The ATIA is supposed to respect the rule of equal treatment: a presumption that requests for information will be treated similarly, without regard to the profession of the requester or the purpose for which the information is sought". Regarding Scope, Prof. Roberts observed that "a longstanding difficulty with the ATIA has been its failure to include many key federal institutions. For many years, the difficulty [had] centered on the exclusion of Crown Corporations; more recently, the problem has extended to include government contractors and a range of quasi-governmental entities that perform critical public functions."

In September 2008, a 393-page report, sponsored by several Canadian newspaper groups together with the B.C. Freedom of Information and Privacy Association and two Vancouver lawyers, compared Canada's Access to Information Act to the "Freedom of Information" laws of the provinces and of 68 other nations. As the title of the report implies: "Fallen Behind: Canada's Access to Information Act in the World Context", it concludes that "Canada surely needs to at least raise its own FOI laws up to the best standards of its Commonwealth partners–and then, hopefully, look beyond the Commonwealth to consider the rest of the world. This is not a radical or unreasonable goal at all, for to reach it, Canadian parliamentarians need not leap into the future but merely step into the present."

In 2009, Justice Minister Rob Nicholson was reported to have emphatically told the House of Commons Standing Committee on Access to Information, Privacy and Ethics on 4 May that: "I want you to know that I completely disagree with anybody who would suggest that this country has a dismal record on anything related to access to information issues". Mr. Nicholson went on to say "this country has an outstanding record, and if anyone has anything different to say, then I say they are completely wrong."

On 29 September 2009, Stanley Tromp, the Freedom of Information caucus coordinator of the Canadian Association of Journalists and author of the 2008 Fallen Behind report, addressed the Conference for Parliamentarians: Transparency in the Digital Era. Mr. Tromp reported that "FOI experts in other countries have publicly noted the forlorn status of our ATI Act in the world context". Examples he provided include:

- David Banisar, Senior Legal Counsel for the London-based human rights organization ARTICLE 19, wrote in his 2006 Global FOI Survey "There is wide recognition that the ATI Act, which is largely unchanged since its adoption, is in need of drastic updating".
- Australian law professor Rick Snell called the Canadian Act "fairly abysmal," and Ottawa's approach to providing information as a 19th-century, horse-and-buggy attempt at "managing secrecy."
- A report from the Commonwealth Human Rights Initiative found that the right of access in Canada "falls short" of compliance with Article 19 of the 1976 United Nations' International Covenant on Civil and Political Rights.

In October 2010, an international comparison of access to government information ranked Canada last among four commonwealth nations together with ireland; a significant change from only a decade earlier when the country often served as a model for freedom of information internationally. The University College London study comparing Canada, the UK, Australia, New Zealand, and Ireland was published in Government Information Quarterly.

In September 2014, a book was published entitled Irresponsible Government: The Decline of Parliamentary Democracy in Canada. The author is Brent Rathgeber, sitting as an independent Member of Parliament in 2014 since his resignation from the Conservative caucus in 2013. He had formerly been a Progressive Conservative member of the Legislative Assembly of Alberta. In the book, Mr. Rathgeber contrasted the current state of Canadian democracy to the founding principles of responsible government established by the Fathers of Confederation in 1867. He examined the consequences of the inability or disincentive of modern elected representatives to perform their constitutionally mandated duty to hold the prime minister and his cabinet to account and the resultant disregard with which the executive now views Parliament. With this as context, Mr. Rathgeber devoted Chapter 11 to Withholding the power: Canada's broken Access to Information laws. He conveyed the opinion of Information Commissioner Suzanne Legault that two of the most fundamental shortcomings of the present Act were that it was not updated to cope with either the impact of digital information technology or the increase in scale and complexity of government and the centralization and concentration of decision making. Another key problem is that the commissioner lacks the power to compel rather than only recommend the release of requested information that does not merit secrecy on the basis of limited, justifiable grounds, a power that exists in other jurisdictions including several Canadian provinces. To add to the problem, the list of exceptions available in the existing Act had grown much larger in recent years. Mr. Rathgeber reported the commissioner to have said that "Canada's access regime [was] so dysfunctional that the RCMP has actually stopped responding to access requests entirely, and the Department of National Defence has stated that it will require 1100 days to complete a single request it has been working on". He also noted "a growing body of evidence that government bureaucrats, and especially political staff, are conducting their business verbally, without retaining notes, or alternatively, are exchanging correspondences through private email addresses and/or employing digital devices that leave no trace". The commissioner was reported to recommend that a reworked Act should correct the aforementioned shortcomings as well as extend the act to cover Parliament, including parliamentary administration, and ministers' offices, where much of the policy development and decision making regarding taxpayer dollars is done.

In September 2014, Canadian Press reported that a previously obscure Treasury Board directive in the summer of 2013 introduced a policy that required federal bureaucrats to consult departmental lawyers about whether documents should be classified as secrets. Such decisions were formerly made by the Privy Council Office (PCO), the secretariat of the federal cabinet. After the policy change, the PCO is consulted in "complex cases only", a practice that was described as "outrageous" by professor Errol Mendes, a constitutional expert at the University of Ottawa and former Senior Advisor to the PCO. He stated that only the PCO is fully informed about whether a document has been prepared for — or seen by — the federal cabinet and is, therefore, eligible for exclusion. The effect of the directive was the suppression of a much wider range of documents, doubling the rate of complaints to the Information Commissioner, an independent ombudsman. Suzanne Legault, the Commissioner incumbent in this period, expressed concern, describing the scope of the new basis for exclusion from release as "extremely broad", and failing to "respect fundamental tenets of freedom of information". Liberal Member of Parliament John McKay described his attempts to extract information required to make "independent judgments" in the fulfillment of parliamentary duties as "an exercise in frustration". Complaints were expressed also by news media as well as federal officers responsible for oversight, including the Auditor General, the Parliamentary Budget Officer, and the military ombudsman. Michael Ferguson (Auditor General) said that his attempts in early 2014 to audit public pension plans to evaluate their long-term health had been stymied by bureaucrats at Department of Finance and Treasury Board. Kevin Page, the Parliamentary Budget Officer during the period 2008−2013, stated that neither Parliament nor his office could obtain the information that it needed. He elaborated: "the government was asking Parliament to vote on bills without relevant financial information and were hiding behind the veil of cabinet confidence. This undermined accountability for Parliament and the accountability of the public service." He concluded that the Act required a major revision.

== See also ==
- Freedom of information in Canada
- Freedom of information legislation
- Info Source - repository of information available through the Privacy Act and Access to Information Act
