= Personal Information Protection and Electronic Documents Act =

2000 Canadian law

Parliament of Canada
- Long title: An Act to support and promote electronic commerce by protecting the personal information that is collected, used or disclosed in certain circumstances, by providing for the use of electronic means to communicate or record information or transactions, and by amending the Canada Evidence Act, the Statutory Instruments Act and the Statute Revision Act
- Citation: S.C. 2000, c. 5
- Enacted by: Parliament of Canada
- Assented to: 13 April 2000
- Commenced: Section 1 in force 13 April 2000; Parts 2, 3 and 4 in force 1 May 2000; Part 1 in force 1 January 2001; Part 5 in force 1 June 2009

Legislative history
- Bill title: 36th Parliament, Bill C-6
- Introduced by: John Manley, Minister of Industry

The Personal Information Protection and Electronic Documents Act (PIPEDA; French: Loi sur la protection des renseignements personnels et les documents électroniques) is a Canadian law relating to data privacy. It governs how private sector organizations collect, use and disclose personal information in the course of commercial business. In addition, the Act contains various provisions to facilitate the use of electronic documents. PIPEDA became law on 13 April 2000 to promote consumer trust in electronic commerce. The act was also intended to reassure the European Union that the Canadian privacy law was adequate to protect the personal information of European citizens. In accordance with section 29 of PIPEDA, Part I of the Act ("Protection of Personal Information in the Private Sector") must be reviewed by Parliament every five years. The first Parliamentary review occurred in 2007.

PIPEDA incorporates and makes mandatory provisions of the Canadian Standards Association's Model Code for the Protection of Personal Information, developed in 1995. However, there are a number of exceptions to the Code where information can be collected, used and disclosed without the consent of the individual. Examples include reasons of national security, international affairs, and emergencies. Under the Act, personal information can also be disclosed without knowledge or consent to investigations related to law enforcement, whether federal, provincial or foreign. There are also exceptions to the general rule that an individual shall be given access to their personal information. Exceptions may include information that would likely reveal personal information about a third party, information that cannot be disclosed for certain legal, security, or commercial proprietary reasons, and information that is subject to solicitor-client privilege.

== Overview ==
"Personal Information", as specified in PIPEDA, is as follows: information about an identifiable individual, but does not include the name, title or business address, or telephone number of an employee of an organization.

The Act gives individuals the right to

- know why an organization collects, uses, or discloses their personal information;
- expect an organization to collect, use or disclose their personal information reasonably and appropriately, and not use the information for any purpose other than that to which they have consented;
- know who in the organization is responsible for protecting their personal information;
- expect an organization to protect their personal information by taking appropriate security measures;
- expect the personal information an organization holds about them to be accurate, complete, and up-to-date;
- obtain access to their personal information and ask for corrections if necessary; and
- complain about how an organization handles their personal information if they feel their privacy rights have not been respected.

The Act requires organizations to

- obtain consent when they collect, use, or disclose their personal information;
- supply an individual with a product or a service even if they refuse consent for the collection, use, or disclosure of your personal information unless that information is essential to the transaction;
- collect information by fair and lawful means; and
- have personal information policies that are clear, understandable, and readily available.

== Implementation ==
The implementation of PIPEDA occurred in three stages. Starting in 2001, the law applied to federally regulated industries (such as airlines, banking and broadcasting). In 2002, the law was expanded to include the health sector. Finally in 2004, any organization that collects personal information in the course of commercial activity was covered by PIPEDA, except in provinces that have "substantially similar" privacy laws. As of October 2018, seven provinces have privacy laws that have been declared by the federal Governor in Council to be substantially similar to PIPEDA:

- An Act Respecting the Protection of Personal Information in the Private Sector (Quebec)
- The Personal Information Protection Act (British Columbia)
- The Personal Information Protection Act (Alberta)
- The Personal Health Information Protection Act (Ontario), "with respect to health information custodians"
- The Personal Health Information Privacy and Access Act (New Brunswick), "with respect to personal health information custodians"
- The Personal Health Information Act (Newfoundland and Labrador), "with respect to health information custodians"
- The Personal Health Information Act (Nova Scotia), "with respect to health information custodians"
- Memorandum of Understanding

=== Personal Information Protection Act (British Columbia) ===
Notable provisions of PIPA:

- Consent must be garnered for the collection of personal information
- Collection of personal information limited to reasonable purposes
- Limits use and disclosure of personal information
- Limits access to personal information
- Stored personal information must be accurate and complete
- Designates the role of the Privacy Officer
- Policies and procedures for breaches of privacy
- Measures for resolution of complaints
- Special rules for employment relationships

=== Personal Health Information Protection Act (Ontario) ===
The Personal Health Information Protection Act, known by its acronym PHIPA (typically pronounced 'pee-hip-ah'), established in 2004, outlines privacy regulations for health information custodians in Ontario, Canada. Breaches of PHIPA are directed to the Ontario Information and Privacy Commissioner.

The Personal Health Information Protection Act serves three important functions:

- To govern the collection, use, and disclosure of personal health information by health information custodians.
- To provide patients with a right to request access to and correction of their records of personal health information held by health information custodians.
- To impose administrative requirements (regulations) on custodians with respect to records of personal health information.

== Amendment ==
On June 18, 2015, the Digital Privacy Act (Senate Bill S-4) became law, amending the PIPEDA to include a business transaction exemption, mandatory breach notification requirements, enhanced powers for the Privacy Commissioner, and various other updates.

The PIPEDA sets out ground rules for how private sector organizations may collect, use or disclose personal information in the course of commercial activities. PIPEDA also applies to federal works, undertakings, and business in respect of employee personal information. The law gives individuals the right to access and request correction of the personal information these organizations may have collected about them.

In general, PIPEDA applies to organizations' commercial activities in all provinces, except organizations that collect, use or disclose personal information entirely within provinces that have their own privacy laws, which have been declared substantially similar to the federal law. In such cases, it is the substantially similar provincial law that will apply instead of PIPEDA, although PIPEDA continues to apply to federal works, undertakings or businesses and to interprovincial or international transfers of personal information.

Recently, the Office of the Privacy Commissioner of Canada, as well as academics and members of civil society, have claimed that it does not address modern challenges of privacy law sufficiently, calling for reforming PIPEDA in view of AI. The Canadian government responded to these calls with a comprehensive reform project currently under Parliamentary discussion.

== IP addresses and digital privacy ==
In R. v. Bykovets (2024), the Supreme Court of Canada ruled that individuals have a reasonable expectation of privacy in their IP addresses in relation to searches under section 8 of the Canadian Charter of Rights & Freedoms. The Court found that IP addresses can reveal intensely private information by linking internet users to their online activities, other online data, and ultimately their identities. The Court further held that access to IP address information requires prior judicial authorization, supported by sufficient evidence to justify the request. Legal commentators have noted the decision's significance to personal privacy law, recognizing it reinforces the notion that an IP address can be used to identify an individual, and identifiability is a core characteristic of PIPEDA's definition of personal information.

== Remedies ==
The Act does not create an automatic right to sue for violations of the law's obligations. Instead, PIPEDA follows an ombudsman model in which complaints are taken to the Office of the Privacy Commissioner of Canada. The Commissioner is required to investigate the complaint and to produce a report at its conclusion. The report is not binding on the parties but is more of a recommendation. The Commissioner does not have any powers to order compliance, award damages, or levy penalties. The organization complained about does not have to follow the recommendations. The complainant, with the report in hand, can then take the matter to the Federal Court of Canada. The responding organization cannot take the matter to the courts, because the report is not a decision and PIPEDA does not explicitly grant the responding organization the right to do so.

PIPEDA provides, at section 14, the complainant the right to apply to the Federal Court of Canada for a hearing with respect to the subject matter of the complaint. The Court has the power to order the organization to correct its practices, to publicize the steps it will take to correct its practices, and to award damages.

== Proposed Bill C-475 ==
As a result of long-enduring and central gap in Canada's privacy protections, Bill C-475 was proposed in February 2013 by Charmaine Borg, MP, proposing several amendments to the Act. Bill C-475 was defeated in January 2014.

== See also ==
- Fighting Internet and Wireless Spam Act
- Information privacy law
- Information privacy
