= Freedom of information laws by country =

Legal frameworks for the right to know

Freedom of information laws are designed to grant the general public access to data held by government bodies and, where applicable, entities on the private sector. The emergence of freedom of information legislation is a response to increasing dissatisfaction with the lack of transparency on matters such as government policy development and decision making. In recent years the term "Access to Information Act" has also been used. Freedom of Information laws establish "right-to-know" legal provisions whereby requests for information of public interest, often (but not exclusively) government-related, must be obliged and provided at little or no cost, subject to certain exceptions. A broader sense of the duty to publish and promote openness is already stated in most constitutions. However, constitutional provisions may not, in practice, suffice to effect the right to access information if specific support legislation does not exist. Additionally, the United Nations' Sustainable Development Goal 16 is to establish that public access to information is entitled the protection of fundamental freedoms, as a means to ensure accountable, inclusive and just institutions.

Over 100 countries around the world have implemented some form of freedom of information legislation. Sweden's Freedom of the Press Act of 1766 is the oldest in the world. Historically, freedom of information laws were rare. Aside from Sweden, no other state had them until after the UN’s 1948 Universal Declaration of Human Rights. Freedom of information laws increased substantially from the 1990s onwards. A dozen states had freedom of information laws in 1990, whereas more than 85 had them by 2011.

== Introduction ==
Over 100 countries around the world have implemented some form of freedom of information legislation. Sweden's Freedom of the Press Act of 1766 is the oldest in the world. Only after the UN’s 1948 Universal Declaration of Human Rights, did other states begin adopting freedom of information laws.

Most freedom of information laws exclude the private sector from their jurisdiction thus information held by the private sector cannot be accessed as a legal right. This limitation has serious implications because the private sector performs many functions which were previously the domain of the public sector. As a result, information that was previously public is now within the private sector, and the private contractors cannot be forced to disclose information.

Other countries are working towards introducing such laws, and many regions of countries with national legislation have local laws. For example, all U.S. states have laws governing access to public documents belonging to the state and local taxing entities. Additionally, the U.S. Freedom of Information Act governs record management of documents in the possession of the federal government.

A related concept is open meetings legislation, which allows access to government meetings, not just to the records of them. In many countries, privacy or data protection laws may be part of the freedom of information legislation; the concepts are often closely tied together in political discourse.

A basic principle behind most freedom of information legislation is that the burden of proof falls on the body asked for information, not the person asking for it. The person making the request does not usually have to give an explanation for their actions, but if the information is not disclosed a valid reason has to be given.

In 2015 The UNESCO General Conference voted to designate 28 September as “International Day for the Universal Access to Information” or, as it is more commonly known, Access to Information Day. The date had previously been celebrated as “Right to Know Day” since 2002. The UNESCO resolution recommends approval by the UN General Assembly. On 15 October 2019, the UN General Assembly adopted by consensus resolution A/RES/74/5 proclaiming 28 September as the International Day for Universal Access to Information.

== Legislation by country ==
=== Albania ===
In Albania, the constitution of 1998 guarantees the right of access to information; the legislation for supporting this is Law no. 119/2014 "On the right to information" (Ligji nr. 119/2014 "Për të drejtën e informimit"). The law regulates the right of access to information being produced or held by public sector. The rules contained in this law are designated to ensure the public access to information, in the framework of assuming the rights and freedoms of the individual in practice, as well as establishing views on the state and society situation. This law aims also at encouraging integrity, transparency and accountability of the public sector bodies. Every person shall, where deemed that the rights provided for in this law have been violated, be entitled to file a complaint administratively to the Information and Data Protection Commissioner's Office.

=== Argentina ===
In Argentina, the Access to Public information Act (Law 27,275) was adopted in 2016.

=== Armenia ===
The Law on Freedom of Information was unanimously approved by the Parliament on 23 September 2003 and went into force in November 2003.

=== Australia ===
In Australia, the Freedom of Information Act 1982 was passed at the federal level in 1982, applying to all "ministers, departments and public authorities" of the Commonwealth. The act was amended in 2010 under the Rudd Government, establishing the government office of the information commissioner, to further promote freedom of information.

There is similar legislation in all states and territories:

- Australian Capital Territory, the Freedom of Information Act 1989
- New South Wales, the Government Information (Public Access) Act 2009
- Northern Territory, the Information Act 2003
- Queensland, the Right to Information Act 2009
- South Australia, the Freedom of Information Act 1991
- Tasmania, the Right to Information Act 2009
- Victoria, the Freedom of Information Act 1982
- Western Australia, the Freedom of Information Act 1992

=== Austria ===
In 2024, Austrian Constitution was amended to replace the provision assuring "secrecy" with Freedom of Information, and the new constitutional provision, together with the new Freedom of Information Act, will come in effect on 1 September 2025.

"Austria’s government has frequently been criticized for inadequate transparency. Official secrecy remains enshrined in the constitution, and Austria’s overall legal framework on access to information is weak" writes the NGO Freedom House in its 2022 and 2023 reports. Reporters without Borders (RSF): "In Austria, press freedom has been undermined by various political pressures or restrictions on access to information."

In the context of a newly proposed public access law that has yet to be passed by parliament, Transparency International writes: "More than 110 countries have already created freedom of information – Nonsense that this should not be possible in Austria."

=== Azerbaijan ===
In Azerbaijan, a Law on Access to Information was approved in 2005. It has gone into effect. Previously in 1998 there was accepted Law on Freedom on Information, but the Law of 2005 provided more detailed and secured regulation for access to official information.

=== Bangladesh ===
On 21 October 2008, the Caretaker Government of Bangladesh issued in the Bangladesh Gazette the Right to Information Ordinance (No. 50 of 2008). The Ordinance was passed by the following government of Bangladesh in its first parliamentary session on 29 March 2009.

=== Belgium ===
Article 32 of the Constitution was amended in 1993 to include a right of access to documents held by the government.

=== Belize ===
In Belize, the Freedom of Information Act was passed in 1998 was amended in 2000 and is currently in force, though a governmental commission noted that "not much use has been made of the Act".

=== Bhutan ===
The National Assembly of Bhutan passed an RTI Bill in February 2014. Its purpose is to curb corruption by providing the public with the right to access information.

=== Bosnia and Herzegovina ===
Bosnia and Herzegovina (BiH) was the first country in the Balkan region to adopt a Freedom of Information Act. Freedom of Access to Information Act or FOIA – was adopted by the Parliament Assembly of Bosnia and Herzegovina on 17 November 2000. Both federal entities – the Republika Srpska and the Federation of Bosnia and Herzegovina – passed freedom of information laws in 2001, the Freedom of Access to Information Act for the Republika Srpska and Freedom of Access to Information Act for the Federation of Bosnia and Herzegovina respectively.

The FOIA Act changed on the BiH state level two times. The first alteration was passed in 2006, enabling stronger legal protection within the framework of administrative law of BiH. The second alteration was passed in December 2009, which enforced legal penalties for prescribed violations.

=== Brazil ===
In Brazil, the Article 5, XXXIII, of the Constitution sets that "everyone shall have the right to receive information of his own interest or of public interest from public entities, which shall be given within the time prescribed by law". Also, article 22 of the Federal law nº 8.159/1991 grants the right to "full access to public documents". A statute passed in 2011 and that will enter into force in 2012 (Federal Law 12.527/2011, promulgated on 28 November 2011) regulates the manner and the timetable for the information to be given by the State.

=== Bulgaria ===
In Bulgaria, the Access to Public Information Act (APIA) was passed in 2000, following a 1996 recommendation from the Constitutional Court to implement such a law. The act defined public information as any information related to the social life in the Republic of Bulgaria. It allows citizens of Bulgaria access to public information created by state bodies and provides principles under which the information may be accessed, as well as when access can be denied.

==== Amendments to APIA ====
The Access to Public Information Act was amended in 2005, 2007, 2008, 2011, 2015, and 2018. Several amendments, particularly those made in 2007 and 2018, faced backlash from government organizations, media, journalists, and information advocates.

The 2007 amendments to the act were criticized for limiting access by extending reply times from 14 to 20 business days, removing the obligation for public authorities to provide partial access and allowing fees to be charged for information requests. Despite widespread criticism, all of the 2007 amendments were passed.

In 2008, the authorities obligated to provide information were expanded, and the obligation for proactive publishing of information online was introduced. Additional focus was placed on access to information related to trade secrets.

2015 brought extensive changes to the APIA with a focus on the digital aspects of information access, such as the publication of information online and the acceptance of e-requests. Amendments included: allowing citizens to submit e-requests for information with no need for electronic signatures, clarifying the definition of a “public law organization” expanding the organizations that comply with the APIA, requiring public sector bodies to publish their material in machine readable formats with all appropriate metadata, the calculation of fees and information reuse, and expanding categories of information required to be proactively made available online. The amendments also discuss third party consent and dissent, allowing public agencies to provide partial access to information to a requestor if a third party does not respond within 14 days.

In 2018, amendments were introduced to Article 40 of the APIA which states that request or denial of access to information may be appealed in front of the Administrative or Supreme Court . The amendment to Article 40 in 2018 made information requests unable to be subjected to a cassation appeal.

=== Canada ===
In Canada, the Access to Information Act allows citizens to demand records from federal bodies. The act came into force in 1983, under the Pierre Trudeau government, permitting Canadians to retrieve information from government files, establishing what information could be accessed, mandating timelines for response. This is enforced by the Information Commissioner of Canada.

There is also a complementary Privacy Act that was introduced in 1983. The purpose of the Privacy Act is to extend the present laws of Canada that protect the privacy of individuals with respect to personal information about themselves held by a federal government institution and that provide individuals with a right of access to that information. It is a Crown copyright. Complaints for possible violations of the Act may be reported to the Privacy Commissioner of Canada.

Canadian access to information laws distinguish between access to records generally and access to records that contain personal information about the person making the request. Subject to exceptions, individuals have a right of access to records that contain their own personal information under the Privacy Act but the general public does not have a right of access to records that contain personal information about others under the Access to Information Act. Each province and territory in Canada has its own access to information legislation. In all cases, this is also the provincial public sector privacy legislation. For example:

- Freedom of Information and Protection of Privacy Act (Alberta)
- Freedom of Information and Protection of Privacy Act (British Columbia)
- Freedom of Information and Protection of Privacy Act (Manitoba)
- Right to Information and Protection of Privacy Act (New Brunswick)
- Access to Information and Protection of Privacy Act (Newfoundland and Labrador)
- Access to Information and Protection of Privacy Act (Northwest Territories)
- Freedom of Information and Protection of Privacy Act (Nova Scotia)
- Access to Information and Protection of Privacy Act (Nunavut)
- Freedom of Information and Protection of Privacy Act (Ontario)
- Freedom of Information and Protection of Privacy Act (Prince Edward Island)
- Freedom of Information and Protection of Privacy Act (Saskatchewan)
- Act respecting Access to documents held by public bodies and the Protection of personal information (Quebec)
- Access to Information and Protection of Privacy Act (Yukon)

From 1989 to 2008, requests made to the federal government were catalogued in the Coordination of Access to Information Requests System.

A 393-page report released in September 2008, sponsored by several Canadian newspaper groups, compares Canada's Access to Information Act to the FOI laws of the provinces and of 68 other nations.

In 2009, The Walrus (magazine) published a detailed history of FOI in Canada.

=== Cayman Islands ===
The Freedom of Information Law in the Cayman Islands was passed in 2007 and was brought into force in January 2009. The act applies to public authorities and grants citizens the right to access information created by those public authorities. The act was last revised in January 2021 and includes six sections: preliminary, right of access, repealed, internal review, information managers, miscellaneous.

In the Cayman Islands, all information requests are processed by information managers working in public authorities. A PDF of all public authorities, Information Managers, and contact information as of 2025 is available on the Cayman Island Government website.

Part 1, Preliminary, contains the citation for the Act and definitions of chief officer, consent, information manager, personal information, and public access. Part 2, Right of Access, covers general information such as applications by third parties, provisions to access, reasonable search, receipt and acknowledgment of requests, access to record during working hours, personal information, and third party rights and fees. Part 3, Repealed, contains three acts that have since been repealed and removed from the act. Part 4, Internal Review, states that an internal review can be conducted by a person of higher or equal rank to whoever made an initial decision about an information request. Part 5, Information Managers, outlines the role of information managers, their part in internal reviews, and what information they need to register and monitor information requests. Finally, Part 6, Miscellaneous, discusses what to do if a minor places an information request. It states that a child does not need parental consent to place a request but that the information manager may decide to withhold access depending on the content of the request.

=== Chile ===
In Chile, article 8 of the Constitution provides for the freedom of information. A law titled Law on Access to Public Information (Ley de Acceso a la Información Pública) took effect on 20 April 2009.

=== China ===
In April 2007, the State Council of the People's Republic of China promulgated the "Regulations of the People's Republic of China on Open Government Information" (中华人民共和国政府信息公开条例), which came into effect on 1 May 2008. The 2025 Supreme People's Court Interpretation of the same regulations provides that that courts must adjudicate open government matters where citizens or organizations in China believe covered government information is relevant to their legal rights. The defendant has the burden to show that non-disclosure is legal.

=== Colombia ===
The Colombian constitution grants the right of access to public information through Law 57 of 1985 which thereby mandates the publishing of acts and official documents. This is implemented and applies to documents that belong to official facilities (offices or the like). Additionally, there is the anti corruption statement of Law 190 of 1955 also known as anti corruption act which in its 51st article mandates public offices to list in visible area all the contracts and purchases made by month. The latter taking place slowly. A more modern law, the "Ley de transparencia y del derecho de acceso a la información pública nacional" it's at its final stages.

Article 23 of the constitution states that "Every person has the right to present petitions to the authorities for the general or private interest and to secure their prompt resolution. The legislative body may regulate the presentation of petitions to private organisations in order to guarantee fundamental rights."

This article justifies the existence of a jurisdictional mechanism known a petition action. This action is regulated by the law 1755 of 2015 and is considered by the Colombian Judicial Doctrine as a fundamental human right. According to the law all petitions should be fully addressed in 15 business days. If not addressed the official in charge of resolving the petition may be charged with misconduct.

=== Cook Islands ===
Access to official information is governed by the Official Information Act 2008. The law is based heavily on the New Zealand legislation.

=== Croatia ===
In Croatia, the Zakon o pravu na pristup informacijama (Act on the Right of Access to Information) first introduced in 2003 extends to all public authorities.

=== Cyprus ===
The right of access to information in Cyprus is guaranteed in constitutional provisions on freedom of expression. The No. 184(I)/2017 law on access to information in the southern part of the Republic of Cyprus of the country has been published on 22 December 2017. A law that falls below Council of Europe standards in the Northern occupied part of Cyprus. The right to access to public information is provided in different ways in the two parts of the island, in which Cyprus is de facto divided.

As to 2011, research by the Open Cyprus Project showed that there was a level of 75% of administrative silence island-wide, in response to information requests. Over half of the respondents to this survey stated that, in practice, access to key documents is not possible.

Since late 2013, a draft law on the Right to Access Public Information was being discussed in the Parliament of the Republic of Cyprus.

On 22 December 2017 the law has finally been approved (Law number 184(I)/2017 Law on the Right of Access to Information of the Public Sector).

=== Czech Republic ===
In the Czech Republic, the Zákon č. 106/1999 Sb., o svobodném přístupu k informacím (Act No. 106/1999 Coll. on Free Access to Information) covers the "state agencies, territorial self-administration authorities and public institutions managing public funds" as well as anybody authorized by the law to reach legal decisions relating to the public sector, to the extent of such authorisation.

=== Denmark ===
Access to Public Administration Files Act of 1985 is a Danish act passed by the Folketing concerning public access to governmental records. The Act came into force in 1987 and repealed the Public Records Act of 1970. New version of the Act came into force on 1 January 2014. Denmark is considered to be a historic pioneer in the field of FOI along with Sweden, Finland and Norway. There is no constitutional basis in the Constitution of Denmark for the right of the public to information. Denmark scores 64 points in Global Right to Information Rating.

==== Scope ====
According to the Act of 1985, Section 4 Part 1 states that “any person may ask to see documents received or issued by an administrative authority.” Information concerning administrative matters of the public administration; electricity and heating utilities as well as private bodies receiving public funding or performing public function can be acquired. Yet, the information concerning activities of judicial branch and legislators is not accessible.

==== Procedure ====
Reasons do not have to be given while making a request; however, the authorities can ask for additional information regarding document. The requests are supposed to be handled as soon as possible; if within period of 10 days response to an application was not provided, the authority has to inform on reasons for the delay as well as expected date for a decision. More detailed procedures are not laid down in the Act.

==== Exceptions ====
Access to information is limited by “the obligation to maintain secrecy.” Considerations of State security, defense, foreign policy, external economic interests as well as public financial interests can limit the granting of access to the information. Registers and records processed electronically are excluded from the administrative documents that can be given access to. Section 10 outlines other areas excluded from access, such as records of meetings of the Council of State, minutes, as well as documents prepared for such meetings; correspondence between ministries concerning legislation and material used for scientific research or public statistics.

==== Appeals ====
Decision to grant or not to grant access can be appealed. Decisions can also be appealed externally to Folketingets Ombudsman. Ombudsman can also deliver opinions and review decisions; however, these are not binding even though generally followed. Ombudsman receives 200–300 complaints annually; approximately 15 percent of complaints are ruled in favor of appellants.

==== Revisions ====
The exemption regarding EU documents was taken out of the Act in 1991. Amendments were also made in 2000; they concerned data on the employees of the Government. In January 2014 new Public Records Act was enforced. The new act was highly debated since it was considered to limit transparency in the Government and legislative proceedings; Denmark received one point less in the category of Political Environment when compared with the Freedom of the Press report of 2015. The new legislation caused demonstrations and protests. It can be regarded as a response to the 9/11 terrorist attacks. After the Public Records Act of 2013 came into effect, public access to information regarding the Intelligence Services instead of falling under the Public Records Act is now managed by the Act on the Security and Intelligence Service as well as the Act on the Defense Intelligence Service. In addition, the access to legislative process was further restricted. According to the new Act documents in the drafting stage are not to be accessed as well as “other corresponding political activities,” so restriction is not concerning only Bills. In the future, it will not be possible to find the calendars of ministers being published. Nevertheless, the Act was created while keeping in mind the strengthening the project of the Open Government; the list of institutions covered by the Act was extended as well as list of public-private institutions and companies.

=== Dominican Republic ===
Hipólito Mejía approved Ley No.200-04 – Ley General de Libre Acceso a la Información Pública (Law number 200-04 – Law on Access to Information) on 28 July 2004, which allows public access to information from the government and private organisations that receive public money to conduct state business. Rough drafts and projects that are not part of an administrative procedure are not included.

=== Ecuador ===
In Ecuador, the Transparency and Access to Information Law of 2004 declares that the right of access to information is guaranteed by the state.

=== El Salvador ===
In El Salvador, the Law on Access to Public Information was given assent by The Legislative Assembly of El Salvador on 3 March 2011. The act ensures the right to access information is guaranteed by the state and that all organizations and institutions receiving funding from the government are required to set up a website listing "bylaws, regulations, plans, directories, staff salaries, services provided, collective bargain contracts, budgets, auditing results, contracts, acquisitions, credits and loans, among other reports."

=== Estonia ===
In Estonia, the Public Information Act of 2000 seeks to "ensure that the public and every person has the opportunity to access information intended for public use, based on the principles of a democratic and social rule of law and an open society, and to create opportunities for the public to monitor the performance of public duties". It extends to all "holders of information", covering all state and local government bodies, legal persons in public law and legal persons in private law if they are performing public duties (providing health, education etc.).

=== Europe ===
In matters concerning the local, national and transboundary environment, the Aarhus convention grants the public rights regarding access to information, public participation and access to justice in governmental decision-making processes. It focuses on interactions between the public and public authorities.

==== Council of Europe ====
The recognition of the right to access to public information under Article 10 (including "freedom (..) to receive (..) information") of the European Convention on Human Rights was one of subjects in Guerra v. Italy case before the European Court of Human Rights in 1998. The majority considered Article 10 was not applicable to the complaint. However, the court found that in the specific case, which included living near a high-risk factory, not providing information was in violation of Article 8 (respect to private and family life). Besides, two judges expressed a dissent on applicability of Article 10, and further six judges reserved a possibility, that in other circumstances, right to access to information could be protected by Article 10.

The Parliamentary Assembly of the Council of Europe has considered in 1996, that "public access to clear and full information on this subject [Chernobyl disaster]—and many others for that matter—must be viewed as a basic human right". In 2009, CoE Convention on Access to Official Documents was opened for signature.

==== European Union ====
===== Right of access to documents of the Union =====
Article 42 CFR and Article 15 TFEU give ″[a]ny citizen of the Union, and any natural or legal person residing or having its registered office in a Member State, [...] a right of access to documents of the institutions, bodies, offices and agencies of the Union, whatever their medium." It follows from Article 15 TFEU that this right is "subject to the principles and the conditions to be defined" in legislation.

Regulation (EC) No 1049/2001 of the European Parliament and the Council of 30 May 2001 regarding public access to European Parliament, Council and Commission documents further defines this right of access to documents of the three institutions; for most other EU bodies and agencies, there is a provision in the legal act establishing them which makes Regulation No 1049/2001 applicable to them as well. In some other cases, specific rules apply (e.g. to the EESC, the CoR, the Court of Justice, the Court of Auditors and the ECB). "Document" is defined broadly and it is assumed that all documents, even if classified, may be subject to right of access unless it falls under one of the exceptions. If access is refused, the applicant is allowed a confirmatory request. A complaint against a refusal can be made with the European Ombudsman and/or an appeal can be brought before the European General Court.

===== Re-use of public sector information =====
In addition, Directive 2003/98/EC of the European Parliament and the Council of 17 November 2003 on the re-use of public sector information sets out the rules and practices for accessing public sector information resources for further exploitation. This directive has been reviewed in 2013 by Directive 2013/37/EU of the European Parliament and the Council of 26 June 2013 amending Directive 2003/98/EC on the re-use of public sector information.

===== Register of lobbyists =====
Since 2008, the European Commission operates the Register of Interest representatives, a voluntary register of lobbyists at the European union.

===== Access to Environmental Information =====
Directive 2003/4/EC of the European Parliament and Council provides for citizens of each country to have freedom of access to information on the environment, in line with the requirements of the Aarhus Convention. Governments are required to transcribe the directive into national legislation (for example, in the United Kingdom, the Environmental Information Regulations 2004).

===== Personal data =====
Directive 95/46/EC, the Data Protection directive, provides a variety of rights in relation to personal data, including a right of access. This has been transcribed into national legislation through, for example, the Data Protection Act 1998 (United Kingdom) and the Data Protection 2003 (Ireland).

=== Finland ===
In Finland, the Laki yleisten asiakirjain julkisuudesta 9.2.1951/83 (Act on the Openness of Public Documents of 1951) established the openness of all records and documents in the possession of officials of the state, municipalities, and registered religious communities. Exceptions to the basic principle could only be made by law, or by an executive order for specific enumerated reasons such as national security. The openness of unsigned draft documents was not mandated, but up to the consideration of the public official. This weakness of the law was removed when the law was revised in the 1990s. The revised law, the Laki viranomaisten toiminnan julkisuudesta 21.5.1999/621 (Act on the Openness of Government Activities of 1999), called in short "Publicity Act" (Finnish: Julkisuuslaki) also extended the principle of openness to corporations that perform legally mandated public duties, such as pension funds and public utilities, and to computer documents. Section 12 of the Finnish Constitution enshrines the right of access to information, with everyone having the right to access public documents and recordings, except in instances where the access to information is subject to specific restriction in accordance with an Act of Parliament.

The Publicity Act establishes a process by which any person may access any record in possession of an authority. The person may ask the authority for the document in person or in writing. When making the request, the requester needs to specify the document so that it can be identified. However, the authority is liable to assist the person with its document registers and indices in this task. After receiving the request, the authority has two weeks to give the document. If the decision is negative, and document is withheld, the requester may appeal to the administrative court. The document may be given orally, for reading and copying in the authority's premises or as an electronic or paper copy, as requested by the person. However, the copying may be declined if it would be unfeasible because of the large number of documents or otherwise technically difficult. There are also a number of limitations on the release of electronic documents designed for the protection of the individual privacy.

The reasons for withholding a document are listed in the article 24 of the Act. They may be grouped to three categories: automatic non-openness, conditional non openness or conditional openness. The documents where automatic non-openness is prescribed remain withheld in all cases. In the case of conditional non-openness, the reasonability of the non-openness is reviewed case-by-case by the authority and, if appeals are made, by the court. In the third category, openness is a rule, and the reason for non-openness needs to be established by the authority.

The absolute reasons for non-openness are (subpoint of Article 24 in captions):

- Documents of the foreign policy committee of the Council of State, foreign policy memos of the foreign ministry on political status, negotiations with foreign governments or organisations and diplomatic cryptograms, unless released by the ministry (1)
- registers held by law enforcement for investigation and prevention of crimes, as well as passport or ID card photos and biometric information on them (4)
- statistics and other documents on economic policy that might affect financial markets, until they are released to public (13)
- documents handed over to a statistical authority for the compilation of statistics and documents handed over voluntarily to an authority for purposes of research and statistics (16)
- documents containing medical information, information on sexual orientation or information pertaining to a customer of labour administration or of social services (25)
- documents containing information on a judicial psychiatric examination or on certain personal investigations relating to execution of prison sentences and similar custodial sentences (26)
- documents containing results or information from individual psychological testing (29)
- documents relating to the care of students, as well as any student evaluations containing verbal information on the personal qualities of the student (30)
- documents containing a secret phone number, or the location of a mobile communications device (31)
- documents identifying an anonymous witness (31a)
- documents containing information on individual's political opinions, hobbies, personal habits, membership and activities in associations, family life or opinions uttered within private life. However, information on having held positions of responsibility held or having been a candidate for them is public, as well as being aa founding member of a political party or electoral association. (32)

Conditional non-openness is mandated for the following categories of documents, unless it is "obviously clear" that the protected interest is not endangered:

- documents concerning international relations of Finland, Finnish institutions or Finnish persons, unless it is obviously clear that no harm will befall on Finnish foreign relations now or in the future (2)
- documents concerning criminal investigations or pending prosecutions until the investigation is over or the prosecution has pleaded, unless it is obviously clear that the investigation or the prosecution is not harmed, and no private person will suffer material harm nor suffering (3)
- documents on security of buildings, facilities, communications or information systems, unless it is obviously clear that the security is not endangered (7)
- all documents of Finnish Security Intelligence Service and other documents concerning state security, unless it is obviously clear that state security is not endangered (9)
- documents concerning national defence or military intelligence, unless it is obviously clear that national defence is in no way harmed or endangered (10)
- documents, records and data used as a basis for or concerning an academic thesis, scientific or scholarly research or product development, unless it is obviously clear that the research, development or study, their proper evaluation, the student or the researcher or the funder of the work are not harmed (21)
- documents concerning a refugee or an applicant for a visa, residence permit or an asylum, unless it is obviously clear that the person or his loved ones are not harmed (24)
- information contained in the criminal register and in other registers held by authorities overseeing the execution of punishments, as well as documents of authorities if they contain personal information on persons who have lost their personal freedom or who participate in witness protection programme, unless it is obviously clear that the security, future employment and social reintegration of the person will not be endangered and there is a valid reason for releasing the specific information in question. (28)

Conditional openness is prescribed for the following categories of information:

- technical and tactical methods of police, Finnish Border Guard and prison authorities, if their release would make the work of such authorities more difficult (5)
- administrative complaints during their handling, if their release would harm investigation or be likely to cause suffering or harm to a party in the matter, unless grave reasons exist for release of information (6)
- information on civil defence or rescue preparations and on safety investigations, if the release would endanger rescue work, civil defence preparations, safety or security or their continued development, or would endanger getting information in future safety investigations, or would hurt the victims of an accident, their memory or their loved ones (8)
- information on financial, monetary, labour or fiscal policy measures or their preparations or pre-studies if the release would defeat the purpose of such measures, endanger the negotiation position of the state or otherwise cause great harm to the management of such policies (11)
- studies conducted by regulatory authorities of financial and pension institutions, if the studies include information on the regulated bodies and the release would endanger the proper functioning of financial markets (12)
- documents containing information on endangered species or valuable natural areas, if the release would endanger their preservation (14)
- documents pertaining to an investigation or other control measure by an authority if the release would endanger the regulatory control measure or its purpose (15)
- detailed returns of political candidates on their campaign funding (15)
- business and professional secrets of public bodies, if a competing the body would suffer economic harm, or a public or private body pursuing competing or similar activities would gain a competitive advantage by the release or if the possibilities of a body bound by the Publicity Act to make advantageous purchases or other financial arrangements would be harmed (17)
- documents used by a public body in a collective bargaining or labour action if the release would harm the public body as the employer (18)
- documents used for preparation of a legal action, if the release would harm a public body as a party to a suit (19)
- documents containing information on entrance examination or other examination or test, if the release would defeat the purpose of the test or exam or prevent its future use (22)
- documents containing sensitive information on the private life of a suspect, plaintiff, witness or other party to a criminal investigation, or information on the victim that would hurt the victim's memory or her loved ones, unless the release is necessary to conduct the work of an authority. (26)

Non-open information remains non-open for 25 years after it was created or obtained by an authority. Documents that are non-open to protect the privacy of an individual remain non-open for 50 years after the protected individual has died.

If information is still, after 25 years, valid and describes a security measure of a building, facility, system or method or it is still part of a plan used for national defence or civil defence, it remains non-open as long as the information is pertinent for the purpose. The same indefinite non-openness applies to all documents under international security obligations, if the release might still affect Finnish foreign relations negatively. The non-openness of other documents may be prolonged up to 55 years by the Council of State, if necessary to safeguard a protected interest.

=== France ===
In France, the accountability of public servants is a constitutional right, according to the Declaration of the Rights of Man and of the Citizen.

The implementing legislation is the Loi n°78–753 du 17 juillet 1978 portant diverses mesures d'amélioration des relations entre l'administration et le public et diverses dispositions d'ordre administratif, social et fiscal (Act No. 78-753 of 17 July 1978). On various measures for improved relations between the Civil Service and the public and on various arrangements of administrative, social and fiscal nature). It sets as a general rule that citizens can request a copy of any administrative document (in paper, digitised or other form), and establishes the Commission d’Accès aux Documents Administratifs, an independent administrative authority, to oversee the process, although no administration is required to accept those request.

=== Georgia ===
In Georgia, the General Administrative Code contains a Law on Freedom of Information.

=== Germany ===
In Germany, the federal government passed a freedom of information law on 5 September 2005; it was last updated on 7 August 2013. The law grants each person an unconditional right to access official federal information. No legal, commercial, or any other kind of justification is necessary.

Thirteen of the sixteen Bundesländer—Baden-Württemberg, Berlin, Brandenburg, Bremen, Hamburg, Hesse, Mecklenburg-Vorpommern, Nordrhein-Westfalen, Rheinland-Pfalz, Saarland, Sachsen-Anhalt, Schleswig-Holstein and Thüringen—have approved individual "Informationsfreiheitsgesetze" (Freedom of Information laws).

=== Greece ===
In Greece, the 1975 Greek Constitution guaranteed the right of access to administrative documents and the right of citizens to obtain information. However it was not until 1986 that the first law was passed to provide for access to information.

Article 16 (Right to Access Administrative Documents—Δικαίωμα γνώσης διοικητικών εγγράφων: Dikaioma Gnosis Dioikitikon) of Law 1599/1986 (State-citizenry Relationship—Σχέσεις Κράτους-πολίτη: Skheseis Kratous-politi) introduced the right of all citizens to read most administrative documents. This right is now codified as article 5 (Access to documents—Πρόσβαση σε έγγραφα: Prosvasi se engrafa) of the Administrative Procedural Code (Κώδικας Διοικητικής Διαδικασίας: Kodikas Dioikitikis Diadikasias), Law 2690/1999. Under this article, citizens have a right to know the content of administrative documents. Administrative documents are defined as those produced by public sector entities, such as reports, studies, minutes, statistical data, circulars, instructions, responses, consultatory responses, and decisions. In addition, citizens with a legitimate interest may also access private documents stored by public services. The right cannot be exercised if the document concerns the private or family lives of others, or if the document's confidentiality is safeguarded by specific legal provisions. Furthermore, the public body can refuse access if the document refers to discussions in the Cabinet, or if accessing the document can seriously hamper criminal or administrative violation investigations carried out by judicial, police, or military authorities.

Citizens may study the documents at the place where they are archived, or they may obtain a copy at their own cost. Access to one's own medical data is provided with the help of a doctor. Access to documents should take into account whether they be covered by copyright, patent, or trade secret regulations.

In addition, Law 3448/2006, on the reuse of public sector information, harmonizes the national laws with the requirements on the European Union Directive 2003/98/EC.

=== Guyana ===
Guyana has a freedom of information act, which came into force in 2013, but it has relatively weak provisions. A commission tasked with ensuring asset declarations by government officials has begun functioning since 2018. Guyana also entered into the EITI, which guarantees the transparency of the proceeds of oil reserves of countries.

=== Hong Kong ===
In Hong Kong there are no laws specifically enacted to guarantee the freedom of information.

Since March 1995, the Government of Hong Kong has promulgated a "Code on Access to Information" to serve a similar purpose. This code, like other internal regulations of the Government, was not legislated by the Legislative Council and has a minimal legal status. It requires government agencies listed in its appendix to appoint Access to Information Officers to answer citizens' requests for governmental records. A fee may be charged prior to the release of information. The code does not require the government to archive information.

=== Hungary ===
In Hungary, the Act on the Protection of Personal Data and Public Access to Data of Public Interest of 1992 extends a right of access to all data of public interest, defined as any information processed by a body performing a governmental function. Complaints and contested applications may be appealed to the Data Protection Commissioner (until 2011) or to the court.

In 2005 the Parliament adopted the Act on the Freedom of Information by Electronic Means (Act XC of 2005). The Act has three basic parts: 1. electronic disclosure of certain data by public sector bodies, 2. publicity of legislation and 3. openness of Court decisions.

From 2010 on the Second Orbán Government have changed considerable parts of the legislation, changing the constitution and by releasing a completely rewritten law (Act CXII of 2011 on the right to information self-determination and freedom of information). The move discontinued the Data Protection Commissioner office (in January 2012 the European Commission launched infringement proceedings against Hungary for the abolition of the position and for violation of doing it mid-term), and moved data protection into the National Authority of Data Protection and Freedom of Information (NAIH) government body, run a leader loyal to the government; the results were that controversial data is withheld without merit and needs to be forced out by lengthy and costly court process.

Legally the law withholds openness of public data (Section III and IV) and protection of personal data (section II).

=== Iceland ===
In Iceland the Information Act (Upplýsingalög) Act no. 50/1996 gives access to public information.

=== India ===
The Right to Information Act (RTI Act) was passed by Parliament on 11 May 2005 and was published in the Gazette of India on 15 June 2005. It came into effect on 12 October 2005, replacing the previous Freedom of information Act 2002. The Supreme Court of India had, in several judgments prior to enactment of both Acts, interpreted the Indian Constitution to read, "Right to Information as the Fundamental Right as embodied in the Right to Freedom of Speech and Expression and also in the Right to Life". The RTI Act laid down a procedure to guarantee this right. Under this law all government bodies and government-funded agencies must designate a Public Information Officer (PIO). The PIO's responsibility is to ensure that information requested is disclosed to the petitioner within 30 days, or within 48 hours in case of information concerning the life or liberty of a person. The law was inspired by previous legislation from come states (among them Tamil Nadu (1997), Goa (1997), Rajasthan (2000), Karnataka (2000), Delhi (2001), Maharashtra (2002) etc.) that allowed the right to information (to different degrees) to citizens about activities of any State Government body.

"12. Question No.115 Starred, 28 November 2019: India Justice Report 2019:

Legal Aid to Poor

A number of high-profile disclosures revealed corruption in various government schemes such scams in Public Distribution Systems (ration stores), disaster relief, construction of highways etc. The law itself has been hailed as a landmark in India's drive towards more openness and accountability."

However the RTI has certain weaknesses that hamper implementation. There have been questions on the lack of speedy appeal to non-compliance to requests. The lack of a central PIO makes it difficult to pin-point the correct PIO to approach for requests. There is also a criticism of the manner in which the Information Commissioners are appointed to head the information commission. It is alleged by RTI Activists that bureaucrats working in close proximity with the government are appointed in the RTI Commissions in a non-transparent manner. The PIO, being an officer of the relevant Government institution, may have a vested interest in not disclosing damaging information on activities of his/her Institution, This therefore creates a conflict of interest. In the state of Maharashtra it was estimated that only 30% of the requests are actually realised under the Maharashtra Right to Information act. The law does not allow disclosure of information that affects national security, defence, and other matters that are deemed of national interest.

=== Indonesia ===
The Law of Disclosure of Public Information (Undang-Undang Keterbukaan Informasi Publik) was adopted in 2008 and in full operation since 2010.

=== Iran ===
The Law on Dissemination of and Free Access to Information was approved by Iranian Parliament in 2008. Its English and Arabic renditions were officially released as part of the government's efforts to promote Freedom of Information (FOI) in October 2018.

In 2023 Iranian government charged Etemad after publishing information on denied news by the government around hijab watch guards law obtained by Foia, the government claimed it was top secret.

=== Ireland ===
In Ireland, the Freedom of Information Act 1997 came into effect in April 1998, one year after its enactment. It provided for members of the public to access information specifically about themselves, amend incorrect information, and request an explanation behind administrative decisions concerning themselves, as well as allowing any person to access records generated by a list of specified public bodies. The Act is seen as having led to a sea-change in the relationship between the citizen, journalists, government departments and public bodies. Disclosure is the default assumption of the Act; bodies can withhold information only by citing exemptions specified in the legislation. Decisions of public bodies in relation to requests for information may be reviewed by the Office of the Information Commissioner.

The 2014 Act was amended by the Freedom of Information (Amendment) Act 2003. The amendments introduced fees for non-personal requests and restricted the kinds of material which could be accessed.

The Freedom of Information Act 2014 repealed the 1997 and 2003 Acts, removing most of the restrictions introduced in 2003 and widening the range of bodies covered to all public bodies, unless specifically exempt. It also allowed for the government to prescribe (or designate) other bodies receiving significant public funds, so that the FOI legislation would also apply to them.

=== Israel ===
In Israel, the Freedom of Information Law, 5758–1998, supported by the Freedom of Information Regulations, 5759–1999, controls freedom of information. It defines the bodies subject to the legislation by a set of listed categories – essentially, most public bodies – and provides for the government to publish a list of all affected bodies. However, this list does not seem to have been made publicly available, if indeed it was ever compiled. Many public bodies are not obliged to follow the law, which limits the potential for use by the public.

The Israeli Freedom of Information Law has, in some cases, actually achieved the opposite intended result. some Government agencies now take the position that a citizen may only request information via FOIL—i.e., an official letter designated as such and including the 95 shekel fee. Thus an Israeli citizen in many cases cannot simply write a letter asking a question, and can be asked to file a FOIL application with a fee and wait the minimum statutory 30 days for a reply, which the agency can extend to 60 days. In many cases FOIL letters are simply ignored, or some laconic response is sent stating the request is either unclear, unspecific, too vague or some other legalese, anything in order to keep the information away from the public. When the 60 days are up, if the anticipated result usually yield nothing significant, the applicant must petition the District Court to compel disclosure, a procedure that requires attorneys to draft pleadings and a payment of (approximately) $420 court fee. A judgement in such FOIL appeals in Israel can take many months, and again the agency can easily avoid disclosure by simply not complying, although risking being charged with contempt of court. While there are some successes in courts compelling Israeli government agencies to disclose information, they are usually in non-controversial areas. The law provides for the expected "security" exemption and an applicant applying for such information can expect not to benefit from FOIL (and also have his or her court appeal rejected). Applicants can sometimes be helped by The Movement for Freedom of Information.

=== Italy ===
While Italy does not have a freedom of information act, it has several legislations over the past 35 years. Chapter V of Law No. 241 of 7 August 1990, which provides access to administrative documents, was the first Italian law to allow information requests. Chapter V of Law No. 241 of 7 August 1990 provides for access to administrative documents. However, the right to access is limited. The law states that those requesting information must have a legal interest. The 1992 regulations require "a personal concrete interest to safeguard in legally relevant situations." The act was amended in 2005, inserting the principle of transparency into the law and rewrote article 22 of the law to state that access to administrative documents is to promote transparency and participation.

In 2013, Article 5, d.l. 33/2013, aka the transparency decree, was written into law and expanded the limited access granted by Law No. 241 Chapter 5. The article does not replace Law No. 241, Chapter 5. The article defined transparency as, “total accessibility (of data and documents held by public administrations, in order to protect citizens' rights, promote the participation of data subjects in administrative activity and) encourage widespread forms of control over the pursuit of institutional functions and the use of public resources.” In 2016 Legislative Decree No. 97 amended Article 5, d.l. 33/2013.

Under the 2016 legislation, any person has a right to obtain access to documents, information and data that public entities hold. No particular interest is required in this case, but the law states specific limits for this right, mainly to balance it with other public and private rights. In some cases, these limits are absolutes and in other cases they are subject to discretion. The legislation also outlines general civic access and its limitations, as well as how to submit information requests to.

The last update to the Transparency Decree was made in 2022, with Legislative Decree no. 104/2022. The act expands to include information requests between that of employee and employer and was applicable to all employment relationships as of August 1, 2021. It requires specific and complete information related to employment contracts be mandatorily given between employer and employee. It provides protection for employees in their right to request access to information from employers and the employees right to stability of employment, work planning, multiple employments, and mandatory probationary and training periods.

=== Jamaica ===
In Jamaica, the relevant legislation is the Access to Information Act, 2002.

=== Japan ===
In Japan, the "Law Concerning Access to Information Held by Administrative Organs" (行政機関の保有する情報の公開に関する法律) was promulgated in 1999. The law was enforced in 2001.

Small town governments, rather than the federal government, were the first to take measures to enact freedom of information as the national government was "not...as eager as local governments to deal with freedom of information legislation."

Local efforts in some ways predate national efforts; In many local governments, regulations about information disclosure (情報公開条例) were established starting from the latter half of the 1980s.

=== Latvia ===
The Constitution of Latvia states: "Article 100. Everyone has the right to freedom of expression, which includes the right to freely receive, keep and distribute information and to express his or her views. Censorship is prohibited." The right to access state held information has been repeatedly recognized by the Constitutional Court of Latvia, most notably in its judgment "On Conformity of the Cabinet of Ministers 21 January 1997 Regulations No.46 "On Government Agreements" with the 20 November 1998 "Information Accessibility Law."

The Law on Freedom of Information was signed into law by the State President in November 1998 and has been amended a number of times recently. Any person can ask for information in "any technically feasible form" without having to show a reason. The request can be oral or written. Bodies must respond in 15 days.

=== Malta ===
On 1 September 2012, Legal Notice 156 of 2012 brought the Freedom of Information Act (Chapter 496 of the Laws of Malta) fully into force, allowing the public (resident citizens of Malta, the EU and the EEA) to submit requests for documents/information held by the Government. FOI requests are submitted free of charge but processing of documents by public authorities may require the public to pay fees which never exceed Eur 40. When access to documents is refused, the FOIA in Malta provides for a complaint and appeal mechanism that can be ultimately resolved through the Courts of Appeal.

=== Liberia ===
President Ellen Johnson Sirleaf signed the Freedom of Information Act of 2010 into law in October 2010. Liberia became only the fourth country in Africa, and the first in West Africa, to pass such legislation. The law allows both the media and individual citizens to demand information from any public authority or any private authority that carries out government functions.

=== Malaysia ===
The state of Selangor passed the Freedom of Information (State of Selangor) Enactment 2011 on 1 April 2011, allowing the Malaysian public an access to the state documents including that of local councils, city halls and state government-linked companies. The Enactment came into force on 5 March 2013. Subsequently, the state of Penang passed the Penang Freedom of Information Enactment 2010 on 4 November 2011, allowing the public to access to state documents. Penang's Enactment came into force on 1 January 2015. At the time, both states are under the ruling of the federal opposition Pakatan Rakyat.

=== Maldives ===
The Maldives passed the Right to Information Act (RTI) on 12 January 2014.

=== Mexico ===
The Constitution was amended in 1977 to include a right of freedom of information. Article 6 says in part, "the right of information shall be guaranteed by the state." The Supreme Court made a number of decisions further enhancing that right.

The Federal Law of Transparency and Access to Public Government Information was unanimously approved by Congress in April 2002 and signed by President Fox in June 2002. It went into effect in June 2003.

=== Moldova ===
Article 34 of the Constitution provides for a right of access to information.

The Law of the Republic of Moldova on Access to Information was approved by Parliament in May 2000 and went into force in August 2000. Under the law, citizens and residents of Moldova can demand information from state institutions, organisations financed by the public budget and individuals and legal entities that provide public services and hold official information.

=== Montenegro ===
A freedom of information law was passed in Montenegro late in 2005, after a process of several years.

=== Nepal ===
Nepal Government passed a draft of information act in September 2007 on behalf of freedom. Based on that draft, the government enacted a specific law to regulate right to information on 18 July 2007. However, in February 2009 for the protection, promotion and execution of Right to Information in Nepal National Information Commission formed Right to Information Act, 2007.

=== Netherlands ===
Article 110 of the Constitution states: "In the exercise of their duties government bodies shall observe the principle of transparency in accordance with the rules to be prescribed by Act of Parliament."

The Dutch act on public access to government information entered into force in 1980 as the Wet Openbaarheid van Bestuur, or Wob for short. In 2022, the Wob was replaced by the Wet open overheid, or Woo. Under the Woo and its predecessor, any person can demand information related to an administrative matter if it is contained in documents held by public authorities or companies carrying out work for a public authority. The request can either be written or oral. The authority has 28 days to respond, but can extend this deadline with another 14 days. The act also obliges the government to provide information unsolicited as it is in the interest of good and democratic governance.

=== New Zealand ===
In New Zealand, the relevant legislation is the Official Information Act 1982. This implemented a general policy of openness regarding official documents and replaced the Official Secrets Act.

=== Nigeria ===
Former President Goodluck Jonathan signed into law the Freedom of Information (FoI) Bill, awaited for 12 years by media proprietors and practitioners alike, during which the Villa got knocks for filibustering and lawmakers complained of bombardment by campaigners.

The House of Representatives passed the Bill on 24 February 2011, and the Senate dialed up integrity on 16 March as it delivered on promise to pass it.

The harmonized version was passed by both Chambers on 26 May 2011.It was conveyed to Jonathan on 27 May, and he signed it on 28 May 2011, according to a statement Aso Rock issued on Tuesday.

Two states in Nigeria (namely Ekiti and Lagos State) have adopted the Freedom of Information Act at State level but they have extended the response date at State level from 7 days to 14 days. More states are expected to adopt the bill and come up with their own version.

=== North Macedonia ===
Article 16 of the Constitution of North Macedonia guarantees "access to information and the freedom of reception and transmission of information".

The Law on Free Access to Information of Public Character was adopted on 25 January 2006. It is scheduled to go into force in September 2006.The law allows any natural or legal person to obtain information from state and municipal bodies and natural and legal persons who are performing public functions. The requests can be oral, written or electronic. Requests must be responded to in 10 days.

=== Norway ===
The current freedom of information legislation was enacted 19 May 2006, and superseded the previous law of 1970 by 1 January 2009. Article 100 of the Constitution gives access to public documents. The basic principle of the law is everyone has the right to access to State and municipal documents and to be present at sittings of courts and elected assemblies.

=== Pakistan ===
President Pervez Musharraf promulgated the Freedom of Information Ordinance 2002 in October 2002. The law allows any citizen access to public records held by a public body of the federal government including ministries, departments, boards, councils, courts and tribunals. It does not apply to government owned corporations or provincial governments. The bodies must respond within 21 days.

More recently, by virtue of the 18th Amendment of 2010, article 19A has been inserted in the Constitution of Pakistan. It gives the right to access to information the status of a fundamental constitutional right. Article 19A "Right to Information" reads: "Every citizen shall have the right to have access to information in all matters of public importance subject to regulation and reasonable restrictions imposed by law".

=== Paraguay ===
The National Constitution of Paraguay enacted in 1992, guarantees the right to be informed and to receive true, responsible, and equitable information (Art. 28). The same article states that public sources of information are free, and that a law will regulate the modalities, time periods, and sanctions "in order to make this right effective". In practice, this last provision delayed the recognition of the right due to the absence of a law making it "effective". Congress, government agencies and Courts were reluctant to enforce the right to access public sources of information until 2013. A Supreme Court judgment (No. 1306 of 15 October 2013), marked the beginning of what has been called a "Transparency Spring".

The ruling from the Supreme Court was made in the context of an Amparo filed by a citizen called Jose Daniel Vargas Tellez, after the San Lorenzo Municipality denied him access to the information about the names, the job descriptions and the wages of all the employees that were working in that public office. The Court of First Instance and the Court of Appeals rejected the Amparo on the grounds that information of that type was considered sensitive by the Data Protection and Privacy Act (Law 1682/02 and 1969/02). The latter rulings were challenged on constitutional grounds and the Supreme Court ruled in favor of Vargas Tellez holding that while this information relating to the identity and wages of public employees and officers constitutes personal propriety data, it is nonetheless registered in a "public source of information", which makes it available to any citizen who requests it. The right to access to this information is recognized under the Constitution and international instruments such as the American Convention on Human Rights (Art. 13); The International Covenant on Civil and Political Rights (Art. 19); and the United Nations Convention against Corruption (Art. 13).

Following the Supreme Court's decision, and with the support of the civil society and President Horacio Cartes, the first Transparency law was enacted (Law No. 5189/14) requiring all public offices to disclose information regarding the use of public funds to pay salaries. In addition, The Freedom of Information and Government Transparency Law (Law 5282/2014) was enacted in 2014 and a final regulation of 2015 (Executive Decree 4064/15) set the final step in the road to Transparency. These rules expressly recognize that the right to access public information is a human right, which improves the State, promotes citizen participation and public accountability, and serves as a tool to combat corruption. Currently, all requests to access public information can be done online through a single portal, and government offices are obliged to respond within 15 days.

Paraguay became internationally committed to promote transparency, empower citizens, fight corruption, and harness new technologies to strengthen governance after becoming a member of the Open Government Partnership. Presently, most government offices have Transparency offices and can provide information to citizens and receive reports of corruption. The main Executive agency in charge of promoting Electronic Government is the SENATICS.

Art 28 of the Constitution also states that any person affected by the diffusion of a false, distorted, or ambiguous information has the right to demand its rectification or its clarification by the same means and under the same conditions in which it was divulged, without prejudice to the other compensatory rights. There is also a specific law that regulates habeas data, and any citizen can request a copy of publicly or privately held information relating to them, and can demand that any inaccurate data found be destroyed.

=== Philippines ===
On 23 July 2016, Philippine President Rodrigo Duterte signed an executive order on freedom of information to be implemented in all offices under the executive branch of government. The order, however, contains numerous exceptions and excludes the legislative and judicial branches of government. One exception states that "government officials cannot be compelled to prepare lists and detailed reports on how congressional funds were disbursed". On 17 March 2023, President Bongbong Marcos added more exceptions, including information relating to investigations into the stolen wealth of the Marcos family.

A freedom of expression bill was first filed in the Philippine Congress in 1992. As of 2023, Congress has yet to pass a freedom of information law in the country.

=== Pitcairn Islands ===
Section 13(4) of the Constitution of the Pitcairn Islands provides that "Freedom of information in Pitcairn shall be provided by Ordinance, which shall reflect the freedom of information legislation of the United Kingdom adapted to the circumstances of Pitcairn".

The Freedom of Information Ordinance 2012 implements this requirement.

=== Poland ===
Article 61 of the Constitution provides for the right to information and mandates that Parliament enact a law setting out this right.

The Law on Access to Public Information was approved in September 2001 and went into effect in January 2002. The Act allows anyone to demand access to public information, public data and public assets held by public bodies, private bodies that exercise public tasks, trade unions and political parties. The requests can be oral or written. The bodies must respond within 14 days.

=== Portugal ===
The Portuguese Constitution guarantees the right of access to administrative documents in its Article 268, titled "Citizens’ rights and guarantees [before the Administration]". Its paragraphs (1), (2) and (6) read as following:

"1. Citizens have the right to be informed by the Administration, whenever they so request, as to the progress of the procedures and cases in which they are directly interested, together with the right to be made aware of the definitive decisions that are taken in relation to them.

2. Without prejudice to the law governing matters concerning internal and external security, criminal investigation and personal privacy, citizens also have the right of access to administrative files and records.

[...] 6. For the purposes of paragraphs (1) and (2) the law shall lay down a maximum time limit for responses by the Administration."

The rule enshrined in Art. 268, par. (2) of the Constitution is known as the "principle of open Administration" and it is regulated by Law no. 26/2016 (Lei n.º 26/2016, de 22 de Agosto) which also enacts into national law the European Directives no. 2003/4/EC and 2003/98/EC. Art. 15 of this law requires public entities to respond to each request within 10 days and the law's Chapter 3 created an independent watchdog to keep track of compliance with its rules, the Commission for Access to Administrative Documents (Comissão de Acesso aos Documentos Administrativos).

=== Romania ===
Since 2001 there is one law on Freedom of Information and one on transparent decision-making processes in public administration (a sunshine law).

=== Rwanda ===
The law Relating to Access to Information was passed on 8 February 2013. It puts forth the purpose of the law, recognises the right to access to information, the procedures for accessing information, and compliance related issues.

=== Serbia ===
In Serbia, the Access to Public Information Act gives access to documents of public authorities.

=== Seychelles ===
The President of the Republic, Mr. Danny Faure assented to the Access to Information Act in July 2018. The Access to Information Bill 2018 was published in the Official Gazette on 24 March 2017. The Right of Access to Information is guaranteed under Article 28 of the Constitution of the Republic of Seychelles. This Act gives the public with the constitutional right of access to information held by public authorities performing a governmental function. The Act will is administered and applied by an independent Information Commission, the setting of which has been cleared with the enactment of the Law. The commission is appointed by the President in consultation with the Speaker of the National Assembly on the recommendation of the Constitutional Appointments Authority (CAA).The Information Commission strives to promote awareness, educate and popularise the right to access to information and fosters good governance by enhancing transparency, accountability and integrity in the Public Service and Administration.

=== Slovakia ===
Slovakia passed the Freedom of Information Act in May 2000 (Num. law: 211/2000 Z. z.). Under the law, everybody can demand information from state institutions, organisations, from municipalities, individuals and legal entities financed by the public budget.

=== Slovenia ===
Slovenia passed the Access to Public Information Act in March 2003. The Act governs the procedure which ensures everyone free access to public information held by state bodies, local government bodies, public agencies, public funds and other entities of public law, public powers holders and public service contractors.

=== South Africa ===
Section 32 of the Constitution of South Africa guarantees "the right of access to any information held by the state; and any information that is held by another person and that is required for the exercise or protection of any rights." This right is implemented through the Promotion of Access to Information Act, which was enacted on 2 February 2000. The right of access to privately held information is an interesting feature, as most freedom of information laws only cover governmental bodies.

=== South Korea ===
The Constitutional Court ruled in 1989 that there is a constitutional right to information "as an aspect of the right of freedom of expression and specific implementing legislation to define the contours of the right was not a prerequisite to its enforcement."

The Act on Disclosure of Information by Public Agencies was enacted in 1996 and went into effect in January 1998. It allows citizens to demand information held by public agencies.

=== Sri Lanka ===
Sri Lanka's Right to Information Act No 12 of 2016 was certified on 4 August 2016. After much debate and many amendments to the draft Bill, the final Act comprising 44 Sections was certified in early August 2016. The implementation of the Act is expected to take time due to the necessity of establishing cadre positions in government institutions to provide information to the general public. The Act is considered to hold many strengths and positive features that would effectively authorize citizens to be actively involved in the process of governance. Moreover, Article 14A(1) introduced by virtue of 19th Amendment to the 1978 Constitution of Sri Lanka has paved the way for the recognition of right to information as a fundamental right.

=== Sweden ===
In Sweden, the Swedish Freedom of the Press Act grants public access to official documents and is included in the Constitution of Sweden. Dating back to 1766, it is the first freedom of information legislation in the modern sense. In modern times the right has become known as the Principle of Public Access (Swedish: offentlighetsprincipen).

The Principle of Public Access means that the general public is guaranteed insight into activities pursued by government agencies. All official documents handled by government agencies are public unless they contain information specified as secret under the Public Access to Information and Secrecy Act. Each request to take part of official documents is handled individually and classifying documents or information as secret is subject to appeal. The constitution also grants the right for government employees to pass on information without risk of criminal charges or repercussions and the right to attend court proceedings and meetings of legislative assemblies like the Riksdag.

There are a number of exemptions to this principle when the information concerns:

- The security of Sweden or its relations with another state or international organization
- The central fiscal, monetary or currency policy of Sweden
- The inspection, control or other supervisory activities of a public authority
- The interest of preventing or prosecuting crime
- The economic interests of the public institutions
- The protection of the personal or economic circumstances of private subjects
- The preservation of animal or plant species

=== Switzerland ===
Switzerland is a federal state. Access to federal documents is governed by the Swiss Federal Act on the Principle of Freedom of Information in the Administration, and supervised by the Federal Data Protection and Information Commissioner. Access to documents at the cantonal level is governed by cantonal laws, which are mostly similar to the federal law. As of 2018, the cantons of Appenzell Innerrhoden, Glarus, Lucerne, Nidwalden, Obwalden and Thurgau do not have freedom of information legislation.

=== Taiwan ===
The "Freedom of Government Information Law" (政府資訊公開法), enacted by the Legislative Yuan of the ROC government in Taiwan, has been in force since 28 December 2005.

=== Tanzania ===
Tanzania's Access to Information Act was passed in 2016.

=== Thailand ===
In Thailand, the relevant legislation is the Official Information Act 1997.

=== Trinidad and Tobago ===
In Trinidad and Tobago, the relevant legislation is the Freedom of Information Act, 1999.

=== Tunisia ===
Tunisia adopted a freedom of information law after the revolution, in 2016. However the law was criticized for security related exemptions. A 2018 law requiring public officials revealing their assets was a step forward to transparency.

=== Turkey ===
In Turkey, the Turkish Law on the Right to Information (Bilgi Edinme Hakkı Kanunu) was signed on 24 October 2003, and it came into effect 6 months later on 24 April 2004.

=== Uganda ===
In Uganda, the Access to Information Act (ATI) was approved in 2005 but its regulations were not passed until 2011. The laws states that citizen and especially journalists can demand accountability from a government official. The Hub for Investigative Media (HIM) in Uganda offers training programs that teaches East-African journalists in matters of fact-checking and digital security. HIM also has made government officials are of the ATI law and its provision. They have also conducted a nationwide campaign to train journalists on the knowledge and application of the ATI laws as right holders.

=== Ukraine ===
The 1996 Constitution does not include a specific general right of access to information but contains a general right of freedom of collect and disseminate information and rights of access to personal and environmental information.

The Art. 5 of The Law on Information of 1992 (revised in 2011) provides the term «right for information» which includes the possibility of free collection, usage, distribution, storage and protection of information necessary for the exercise of person's rights, freedoms and legitimate interests.

Law on Access to Public Information was adopted 13 January 2011 and go into force from 9 May 2011. It widens the range of subjects, obliged to provide information, gives legislative definition of public information and makes public information accessible with statutory restrictions.

=== United Kingdom ===
The Freedom of Information Act 2000 (2000 c. 36) is the implementation of freedom of information legislation in the United Kingdom on a national level, with the exception of Scottish bodies, which are covered by the Freedom of Information (Scotland) Act 2002 (2002 asp. 13). Environmental information is covered by further legislation Environmental Information Regulations 2004. Tony Blair, the UK Prime Minister who introduced the Freedom of Information Act, later expressed regret over the act, claiming that the act impeded the ability of officials to deliberate "with a reasonable level of confidentiality".

=== United States ===
In the United States the Freedom of Information Act was signed into law by President Lyndon B. Johnson on 4 July 1966, and went into effect the following year. Ralph Nader has been credited with the impetus for creating this act, among others. The Electronic Freedom of Information Act Amendments were signed by President Bill Clinton on 2 October 1996.

The act applies only to federal agencies. However, all of the states, as well as the District of Columbia and some territories, have enacted similar statutes to require disclosures by agencies of the state and of local governments, though some are significantly broader than others. Some state and local government agencies attempt to get around state open records laws by claiming copyright for their works and then demanding high fees to license the public information. Some states expand government transparency through open meeting laws, which require government meetings to be announced in advance and held publicly.

=== Uruguay ===
The Act was enacted in 2008 under President Vazquez's Administration and is mainly implemented by the Judiciary.

=== Zimbabwe ===
In Zimbabwe, the Access to Information and Privacy Act (AIPPA) was signed by their President Robert Mugabe in February 2002.

== Pending legislation by country ==
- In Argentina, the national freedom of information legislation has been enacted by law 27.275 (2016), but only a few states have their own legislation on a local level. Such is the case of the City of Buenos Aires.
- In Barbados, the Government headed by David Thompson has proposed to put in place a Freedom of Information Bill. The Government has launched various initiatives to vett the proposed bill with the citizens of the country for comment.
- Botswana enacted the Freedom of Information Act and it commenced in 2018. The Data Protection Act was also assented to by Parliament in 2018 and is awaiting commencement.
- In the Cayman Islands, the Freedom of Information Regulations Act 2008 is expected to go into effect on 1 January 2009.
- In Fiji, the constitution gives a general right of access, but enabling legislation has not yet been passed. A draft Freedom of Information Bill was circulated in 2000 but derailed by political unrest; the government has not yet begun work on a second bill.
- In Ghana, the Right to Information Bill 2003 was resubmitted to the Cabinet in 2005.
- In Indonesia, the House of Representatives drafted and submitted a freedom of information bill in 2004, and in 2008 passed with the name Public Information Openness Law.
- In Jordan, there is a draft Law on the Guarantee of Access to Information which was passed onto Parliament at the end of 2005.
- In Kenya, the draft Freedom of Information Act 2007 will soon be tabled into Parliament.
- In Lesotho, the Access and Receipt of Information Bill was before Parliament in 2003–4, but the current status of the legislation is unknown.
- In Mauritius, there is currently no freedom of information legislation. In 2005, the government pledged to enact a Freedom of Information Act but no legislation has yet been passed.
- In Mozambique, the government produced a draft Freedom of Information Bill in August 2005. It is expected to become law within two years.
- In Nauru, the Freedom of Information Act 2004 was laid before the parliament in that year, but was not passed. Further work on the legislation is currently being held back, pending a review of the country's Constitution.
- In Sri Lanka, the 2004 draft Freedom of Information Act has been endorsed by both major parties, but had not been passed as of January 2005. In August 2016 the Right to Information Act was unanimously certified by parliament. Passed Right to Information on 3 February 2017.

== See also ==
- Aarhus Convention on Access to Information, Public Participation in Decision-making and Access to Justice in Environmental Matters
- Access to public information
- Freedom in the world
- Freedom of information
- Information commissioner
- Need to know
- Non-profit organizations and access to public information
- Open government
- Right to know
- Secrecy
- Transparency in behaviour

=== People ===
- Alasdair Roberts
- Zev Yaroslavsky, Los Angeles City Council member (1974–94) who authored city's freedom-of-information ordinance
