= Participative decision-making in organizations =

Extent to which employers encourage employees to share in organizational decision-making

Participative decision-making (PDM) is the extent to which employers allow or encourage employees to share or participate in organizational decision-making. According to Cotton et al., the format of PDM could be formal or informal. In addition, the degree of participation could range from zero to 100% in different participative management (PM) stages.

PDM is one of many ways in which an organization can make decisions. The leader must think of the best possible way that will allow the organization to achieve the best results. According to Abraham Maslow, workers need to feel a sense of belonging to an organization (see Maslow's hierarchy of needs).

== Introduction ==
"Participative management (PM) is known by many names including shared leadership, employee empowerment, employee involvement, participative decision-making, dispersed leadership, open-book management, or industrial democracy".

"The basic concept involves any power-sharing arrangement in which workplace influence is shared among individuals who are otherwise hierarchical unequals. Such power-sharing arrangements may entail various employee involvement schemes resulting in co-determination of working conditions, problem solving, and decision-making".

The primary aim of PDM is for the organization to benefit from the "perceived motivational effects of increased employee involvement"

== Advantages ==
PM is important where a large number of stakeholders are involved from different walks of life, coming together to make a decision which may benefit everyone. Some examples are decisions for the environment, health care, anti-animal cruelty and other similar situations. In this case, everyone can be involved, from experts, NGOs, government agencies, to volunteers and members of public.

However, organizations may benefit from the perceived motivational influences of employees. When employees participate in the decision-making process, they may improve understanding and perceptions among colleagues and superiors, and enhance personnel value in the organization.

Participatory decision-making by the top management team can ensure the completeness of decision-making and may increase team member commitment to final decisions. In a participative decision-making process each team member has an opportunity to share their perspectives, voice their ideas and tap their skills to improve team effectiveness and efficiency.

Participatory decision-making can have a wide array of organizational benefits. Researchers have found that PDM may positively impact the following:

- Job satisfaction
- Organizational commitment
- Perceived organizational support
- Organizational citizenship behavior
- Labor-management relations
- Job performance and organizational performance
- Organizational profits

By sharing decision-making with other employees, participants may eventually achieve organization objectives that influence them. In this process, PDM can be used as a tool that may enhance relationships in the organization, increase employee work incentives, and increase the rate of information circulation across the organization

== Outcomes ==
The outcomes are various in PDM. In the aspect of employees, PDM refers to job satisfaction and performance, which are usually recognized as commitment and productivity In the aspect of employers, PDM is evolved into decision quality and efficiency that influenced by multiple and differential mixed layers in terms of information access, level of participation, processes and dimensions in PDM.

Research primarily focuses on the work satisfaction and performance of employees in PDM. Different measurement systems were applied to identify the two items and the relevant properties. If they are measured with different processes in PDM, the relationship is as described below:

- Identifying problems: Do not have strong relationship with performance. Because even with full participation, participants may not explore their skills and knowledge in identifying problems, which is likely to weaken the desires and motivation then influence performance.
- Providing solutions: Positive and "potentially strong" relations with performance. It is not only attributed to the skills and knowledge could be explored but also the innovative ways employees can provide and generate.
- Selecting solutions: Positive to performance but not likely to enhance satisfaction. If the solutions generated are not acknowledged by the employees who are absent at the previous stage, the satisfaction could lessen.
- Planning implementation: Positive and strong relationship with both performance and satisfaction. Participants are given the possibility to affect the achievement of a designed plan. As the "value attainment" is attached, the extent of performance and work satisfaction increase.
- Evaluating results: Weaker relationship with performance, but positive relationship with satisfaction due to the future benefit.

== Disadvantages ==
One of the primary risks in any participative decision-making or power-sharing process is that the desire on the part of the management for more inclusive participation is not genuine. In the words of Arnstein,

"There is a critical difference between going through the empty ritual of participation and having the real power needed to affect the outcome of the process. This difference is brilliantly capsulized in a poster [available for viewing in her article]... [which] highlights the fundamental point that participation without redistribution of power is an empty and frustrating process for the powerless. It allows the powerholders to claim that all sides were considered, but makes it possible for only some of those sides to benefit."

When PDM takes place in a team setting, it can lead to social situations which cause adverse outcomes. These situations include group domination, where one person takes control of the group and urges everyone to follow their standpoints, and peer pressure, where a larger group pressures a smaller group into compromise that they would not otherwise agree to. Time constraints can also be an issue, especially for larger groups; it takes time to come up with ideas, communicate them, and then to rework plans to incorporate the ideas, and when there are many people involved in each step the time can add up and slow down the overall flow of decision-making. Setting time limits and hard deadlines can mitigate this at the risk of missing needed input if time runs out before all parties are heard.

Possible negative outcomes of PDM are high costs, inefficiency, indecisiveness, and incompetence.

Van der Helm, an independent futurist based in the Hague, The Netherlands, outlines ten major disadvantages, or dilemmas, of increased participation. According to him, there are ten dilemmas and the only way to deal with them is to use foresight.

Ten dilemmas:

1. Participation as the answer and as the problem
2. The involvement of the actors
3. The level of ambition of the initiators, the context and the participants.
4. Representation and legitimization – participation works best in a situation where it is not needed, i.e. in an environment in which all interests are taken into consideration
5. Knowledge, power and strategic behavior
6. Formalism or freedom
7. Entering the debate: between timing and perseverance
8. Going beyond information: communication and mediation
9. Results and non-results
10. Appreciating and apprehending success and failure

== Types ==
Decisions are made differently within organizations having diverse environments. A PDM style includes any type of decision transfer from a superior to their subordinates. PDM may take many forms and can run the gamut from informal suggestion systems to direct high involvement at the policy and administrative level. Most researchers agree that PDM is not a unitary concept. Somech delineates five aspects of PDM: decision domain, degree of participation, structure, target of participation, and rationale for the process.

Steinheider, Bayerl and Wuestewald cited Huang as separating PDM into informal and formal types. Ledford distinguishes between three types of PDM: Suggestion Involvement, Job Involvement, and High Involvement. High involvement PDM entails power and information sharing, as well as advanced human resource development practices.

=== Democratic ===
Democratic leadership, also known as participative leadership, is a type of leadership style in which members of the group take a more participative role in the decision-making process. Researchers have found that this leadership style is usually one of the most effective and leads to higher productivity, better contributions from group members, and increased group morale.

The democratic leadership style involves facilitating the conversation, encouraging people to share their ideas, and then synthesizing all the available information into the best possible decision. The democratic leader must also be able to communicate that decision back to the group to bring unity to the plan is chosen.

The democratic leader delegates authority, encourages participation, and relies on personal power (expert and referent power) to manage subordinates. The subordinates with democratic leadership:

- Will perform just as highly as autocratic leaders when he/she is present.
- Will have positive feeling with this style of leadership.
- Will perform well even when the leader is absent.

When the workplace is ready for democratic leaders, the style produces a work environment that employees can feel good about. Workers feel that their opinion counts, and because of that feeling they are more committed to achieving the goals and objectives of the organization.

=== Autocratic ===
In an autocratic participative decision-making style, similar to the collective style, the leader takes control of and responsibility for the final decision. The difference is that in an autocratic style, members of the organizations are not included and the final outcome is the responsibility of the leader. This is the best style to use in an emergency when an immediate decision is needed.

=== Consensus ===
In a consensus participative decision-making style, the leader gives up complete control and responsibility of the decision and leaves it to the members of the organization. Everyone must agree and come to the same decision. This might take a while, but the decisions are among the best since it involves the ideas and skills of many other people. Teamwork is important in this style and brings members closer together while trust and communication increase.

=== Delegated by expertise ===
Decision makers cannot be experts in all fields. In such situations, the decision maker delegates full or partial responsibility of decision-making for a particular area of concern, to the expert on the team for best management outcomes. The participative leader retains the responsibility of final compilation of the draft responses from all. Such delegation is work specific and singular. It depends on the decision maker to compile the expert reports for the final response. Advantages of this type of decision-making process makes the group members feel engaged in the process, more motivated and creative. Expertise brings focused and result oriented solutions for BATNA (Best alternative to a negotiated agreement) as and when necessary. Best management outcomes are obtained by utilizing this strategy. An authoritative decision maker would have a higher rate of success than the Democratic decision maker. This strategy would be a disaster, when applied incorrectly or inappropriately is a major disadvantage.

== Concepts and methods ==
=== Dimensions ===
After Lewin's early research on PDM in 1947, scholars started to explore different dimensions of PDM. In 1988, it was indicated that six dimensions of PDM had been recognized and analyzed. Those six dimensions are as follows:

1. Participation in work decisions: Characterized as formal, long-term and direct participation. The content in this dimension focuses on work, e.g. task distribution, organizational methods of the task.
2. Consultative participation: Same to the previous one except it has lower level of influence in decision-making.
3. Short-term participation: Employees' participation is temporary, ranges from sessions of several hours to campaigns of several days. It is recognized as formal and direct.
4. Informal participation: Could happen in interpersonal relationships between employers and employees. Usually no fixed rules and specific contents are decided in advance.
5. Employee ownership: Formal and indirect participation. Although subordinates have the chance to participate in decision-making, usually the typical employees cannot.
6. Representative participation: Measured as formal and indirect. In organizations, the degree of the influence is medium as representatives playing a role that mediate between typical employees and superior.

Based on previous literature, Black and Gregersen also defined six different dimensions of PDM—rationale, structure, form, decision issues, degree of involvement and decision process—which can be seen in the table below:.

Rationale	Democratic: employees have rights to participate in DM. Pragmatic: high work efficiency, productivity, profits, etc.
Structure	Formal: the format has been decided previously. Informal: no fixed format, content, few rules.
Form	Direct: immediately evolve in DM, present personal opinions. Indirect: representatives are assigned to participate in DM.
Decision Issues	Includes 4 aspects: work and task design, work conditions, strategies and capital distribution.
Degree of Involvement	Different level of involvement generates differential outcomes.
Decision Process	Contains five processes: identify problems, solution-generating, select specific solution, planning and implementation the solution and evaluate the result.

Additionally, employee outcomes can also be evaluated according to six criteria:

1. Rationale: No distinct relationship with performance. However, high level of self-efficacy contributes to higher performance.
2. Structure: Informal PDM encourage job satisfaction, likewise higher level of commitment and motivation.
3. Form: Direct PDM is more effective than indirect PDM. The greater influence enhances work satisfaction. Whereas the power range of indirect PDM could vary from partial to decisive.
4. Decision issues: The major issue relevant to decision contents is the skills and knowledge owning by employees. Relevant knowledge brings higher decision quality and efficiency; participants achieve "value attainment",. thereby raising performance and satisfaction.
5. Degree of involvement: Higher degree of involvement leads to greater control and then encourages employees' performance and satisfaction.
6. Decision process: Planning task implementation is key to improving performance.

=== Foresight ===
Some important constraints:

- Foresight is a personal skill and so repetition should involve the same individuals (not institutions), which is not compatible with the people (rapidly) moving within and between organizations.
- Foresight is often still a voluntary or peripheral job (i.e. few people make foresight their core business), which demands great efforts of organizations and individuals. This may be done once, but not at a regular basis.
- Foresight is often made at particular moments in time, which may help to converge the general attitude of the network. According to Ziegler, long-term vision is developed at critical historical moments (the year 2000, the ecological crisis, the re-organization of a business, etc.). Obviously, these are not very likely to be formalized.
- The results of a foresight are very often only indirectly visible in the follow-up in policy and management. Especially in a large exercise, it is very unlikely that individuals will find justice done to their ideas unless a serious consensus is reached.
- Furthermore, because of the representation dilemma, it is unlikely that binding conclusions will be drawn from any similar activity. Hence, participants will not find any direct feedback and may lack the motivation to invest a second time.

=== Diamond model ===
According to Oostvogels' review of the book "Facilitator's Guide to Participatory Decision-making" by Sam Kaner et al., the book is based on a concept called "The Diamond of Participatory Decision-making" which "... is a schematic representation of the different stages in time through which a team has to move in order to develop a solution that is satisfactory to all."

=== Vigilant interaction theory ===
According to Papa et al., the vigilant interaction theory states that the quality of the group as a decision-making team is dependent upon the group's attentiveness during interaction. Critical thinking is important for all group members in order to come up with the best possible solution to the decision.

Four questions that should be asked:

1. Analyze the problem – What needs to be fixed?
2. Think of objectives – What are we trying to accomplish with this decision?
3. Discuss choices – What possible choices can be used?
4. Evaluate – After coming up with choices, what are all of the positive and negative aspects of each?

=== Role of information ===
To make a good decision, there needs to be a good amount of information to base the outcome on. Information can include anything from charts and surveys to past sales reports and prior research. When making a decision primarily based on the information you are given from your organization, one can come to a conclusion in four different ways.

- Decisive – Little amount of information and one course of action. Decisions are made fast, direct, and firmly.
- Flexible – Little information available, but time is not an issue and they come up with many different courses of action.
- Hierarchic – Much information available, but one course of action is made.
- Integrative – Much information is available, and many decisions are made out of it.

=== Role of technology ===
A new kind of participative decision-making is communication through the computer, sometimes referred to as "Decision-making through Computer-Mediated Technology". Although a relatively new approach, this way can involve endless possibilities in order to reach a major organizational decision. There is a significant increase in more active and equal member participation. Individuals can talk to many other individuals at any time, regardless of geographic location and time zone. An organization can come together on a virtual site developed to make it easier to share ideas, share presentations and even have a chat room where anyone can add their input. Through a chat room, members of the organizations are able to see what everyone says and no one is blocked from offering their ideas. This method also allows for a convenient archival of past decision-making activities.

Some disadvantages of computer-mediated meetings are that sometimes feedback can be slow or there can be many conversations under way at the same time, causing confusion. Flaming (Internet) is another computer-mediated problem which occurs when a person uses inappropriate behavior or language while interacting with another person online. Additionally, members also feel less personal and related to their team members.

== Applications ==
While PDM could conceivably be used in nearly any arena requiring decision-making, the specific examples below help to demonstrate that PDM is being used, where it is being used, and how that is occurring.

=== Environment ===
Although participation in environmental decision-making processes can be granted or attained in many ways, and at many levels, one pivotal international instance establishing the rights of individuals to participate came via the Rio Declaration in 1992. In Principle 10, that declaration sets out that "[e]nvironmental decisions are best handled with the participation of all concerned citizens …" who have "... appropriate access to information concerning the environment held by public authorities …" who are then rightly afforded "… opportunity to participate in decision-making processes".

In Northern Germany, while regulations have been changed to favor more participative forms of decision-making, planning approval decisions for wind farms are still mostly centralized. However, in the implementation of the Water Framework Directive for River Basin Management, stakeholder advisory groups were formed, which provide input to working groups, to whom authority to decide issues by consensus has been delegated by the Federal Ministry of Agriculture, Environment, and Rural Areas.

China has long had a reputation for centralized control of most aspects of daily life. However, since the introduction and success of market reforms, other areas including those linked to the environment have experienced increased openness toward participatory decision-making. In the case of pricing, management, and provision of water services, the Chinese authorities have experimented with public hearings as a way of acclimatizing citizens to the changes in approach and opportunities for their participation, such that "…hundreds of formal public hearings on water tariffs have been organized within 30 provinces, excluding Tibet".

Holley (2010) discusses a review of the extent to which the aims of new environmental governance (NEG) in Australia, including provisions for increased public participation, are being realized. After examining programs at the national and state levels, it was concluded that "…in all but the most rare cases, there were substantial difficulties in fully satisfying the participatory aspirations of the three NEG programs."

While progress is being made in many areas to increase participation in environmental decision-making, as evidenced in Holley's example above, much work remains to be done.

=== Finance ===
In our modern world, PDM in business field of finance are mostly base on the three categories: Autocratic, Collective-participative and consensus participative. Most of the financial organization practices the first category which is the Autocratic; this is because leaders have little or no trust for their employees. The Autocratic category of Decision Making allow the leader to make decision entirely on his or her own without any impute from others and take full responsibility for that decision. This style of decision-making is usually the best choice in case of emergency according to leadershipmanagement.com the decision maker may lose credibility if the decisions lead to a negative result.

Collective-participative decision-making may be used in organizations after an autocratic decision-making approach has produced a negative result. Leaders may use participative decision-making to address the resulting problems. According to leadershipmanagment.com, consensus-based participative decision-making is less commonly used in financial organizations because it can require more time and forbearance. Some organizations may prefer other approaches because participative decision-making can take more time and may delay decisions related to organizational profitability.

=== Medicine ===
In medicine, patient participation in decision-making is commonly known as 'shared decision-making' (SDM).

=== Non-profit organizations ===
One particular issue is that of maintaining freedom of access to public information.

== See also ==
- Art of Hosting
- BATNA
- Co-determination
- Decision-making software
- Effective group decision-making
- Industrial democracy
- Group decision-making
- Participatory management
- Workers' self-management
- Workplace democracy
