= Advancement Via Individual Determination =

Non-profit organization

AVID (Advancement Via Individual Determination)
- Founded: 1980
- Founder: Mary Catherine Swanson
- Founded at: San Diego, California, U.S.
- Purpose: College and career readiness
- Headquarters: San Diego, California
- Region served: United States; Department of Defense Education Activity; U.S. Virgin Islands; Canada; Australia
- President and Chief Executive Officer: Thuan Nguyen
- Website: https://www.avid.org/

Advancement Via Individual Determination (AVID) is a non-profit educational organization that provides professional learning for K-12 educators to close opportunity gaps and improve college and career readiness for elementary, middle and high school students, especially those traditionally underrepresented in higher education. AVID's College and Career Readiness System had its start at the secondary level, with elective classes and work in elementary schools and college campuses.

As of 2025, AVID operates in more than 7,400 schools across 47 U.S. states and several international locations, including Australia, Canada, and Department of Defense Education Activity (DoDEA) schools.

Since 2022, Thuan Nguyen is the president and chief executive officer (CEO).

== History ==
AVID began in 1980 at Clairemont High School in San Diego, US. Founded by English teacher Mary Catherine Swanson. The first elective class had 32 students. AVID now serves more than 2 million students in more than 7,500 schools in 47 US states and 16 countries. Swanson's work received national recognition in 2001 when she was named one of ''TIME'' magazine's “America’s Best Teachers” and received the Harold W. McGraw Jr. Prize in Education.

By the early 1990s, AVID expanded beyond San Diego, leading to the creation of AVID Center, a nonprofit organization to manage program dissemination nationwide.

Over the late 1990s and early 2000s, journalists and researchers began documenting the AVID program and its origins in San Diego. Pulitzer Prize–winning journalist Jonathan Freedman chronicled the development of the program in Wall of Fame: One Teacher, One Class, and the Power to Save Schools and Transform Lives, describing the early cohort model and the focus on academic support for students who had historically been excluded from college-preparatory pathways.

AVID subsequently expanded outside the United States. Archival sources indicate that by 2001 the program had been adopted in schools in Canada and within the U.S. Department of Defense Education Activity (DoDEA) system, alongside continued national growth. AVID remains available in both DoDEA Americas and DoDEA Europe schools, including several designated as Schoolwide Sites of Distinction.

In Australia, AVID was introduced in 2011 through a trial funded by The Victoria Institute at Victoria University. In 2015, AVID Center issued Australia an exclusive license to operate the program nationally. In 2024, AVID Center approved the establishment of its first international subsidiary in Australia to oversee governance and expand implementation.

== Implementation ==
AVID is implemented via school–district partnerships that provide an AVID elective and embed instructional strategies (often summarized as WICOR—Writing, Inquiry, Collaboration, Organization, and Reading) across content areas. The U.S. Department of Defense Education Activity (DoDEA) describes AVID as a framework to strengthen organization, study skills, and access to rigorous coursework in participating schools.

== Products and programs ==
AVID offers a variety of instructional resources and professional learning programs intended to strengthen college and career readiness in participating schools. Its offerings include classroom frameworks, digital learning tools, and educator development pathways that focus on writing, inquiry, collaboration, organization, and reading (WICOR) as core skills for academic success.

- AVID Excel and Emerge are initiatives focused on multilingual learners, particularly long-term English learners, and emphasize academic language, literacy development, and preparation for advanced coursework. Independent evaluations have reported improvements in English proficiency and reading outcomes for participants in AVID Excel compared with students in traditional English Learner services.
- AVID Certified Educator is a credential awarded to teachers and school personnel who complete specialized professional learning on instructional strategies, leadership, and schoolwide implementation. Participants typically complete Communities of Practice and project-based assessments as part of the certification process.
- In July 2025, AVID announced the donation of GoSchoolBox’s Tutoring Management System, a digital platform used for scheduling, tracking, and administering tutoring sessions. The system is intended to support AVID’s peer-tutoring model by providing tools for managing participation and program logistics.
- Student summer offerings and school-year professional learning associated with AVID are documented by university credit partnerships connected to AVID Summer Institute (see Events).

== Events ==
AVID's professional learning calendar includes national, regional, and virtual events:

- Summer Institute (SI) – is a multi-city, three-day training event for educators and school teams. Independent sources document the regular hosting of SI in cities such as San Diego and Orlando, as well as the availability of graduate-level extension credit through university partners. Media reporting has described SI as a large-scale professional learning event that draws thousands of educators annually.
- National Conference (NatCon) – an annual gathering of educators and students; school news coverage documents student keynote/speaking roles and attendance by “thousands of educators.
- AVID hosts a series of webinars that provide virtual professional learning for educators. These sessions cover instructional practices and emerging topics in K–12 education, such as artificial intelligence, digital learning, and college and career readiness. Reporting by the Jack Kent Cooke Foundation notes that AVID has used its webinar format to explore how educators are incorporating new technologies, including discussions on integrating artificial intelligence into STEM classrooms.

== Impact, research, and evaluations ==
Independent reviews and peer-reviewed studies report positive findings in its impact to student performance:

- The U.S. Department of Education's What Works Clearinghouse lists AVID and has reviewed individual studies, including a 2020 quasi-experimental evaluation (n≈10,397) that found statistically significant positive effects on high-school graduation and immediate college enrollment (meets standards with reservations).
- A 2020 study in the Journal of Research on Educational Effectiveness reported favorable associations between AVID participation and high school and postsecondary outcomes, along with cost estimates.
- A multisite randomized trial published in Pediatrics found AVID participation during the transition to high school was associated with healthier peer networks, lower stress (for boys), and stronger school engagement.
- AVID Elementary - An independent evaluation conducted by ECOnorthwest and Calypso Strategy and Research analyzed 14 years of data (2011–2012 through 2024–2025) across eight school districts and more than 230,000 students. The study found that students with two or more years of AVID Elementary participation scored 0.08 standard deviations higher in English language arts and were approximately five percentage points more likely to meet grade-level proficiency than comparable students. Students with sustained participation earned middle school core subject GPAs that were 0.15 standard deviations higher than comparison students and demonstrated small positive effects on later English language arts and mathematics test performance. The evaluation also reported that higher levels of implementation fidelity and professional learning participation were associated with stronger student outcomes.
- AVID Excel - An independent evaluation conducted by RMC Research Corporation examined outcomes for more than 2,100 AVID Excel students across six U.S. states using four years of data (2021–2022 through 2024–2025).[1] The study reported that students who participated in AVID Excel during both grades 7 and 8 scored 0.10 standard deviations higher on grade 8 English language proficiency assessments than comparable students. Participants were also more likely to be reclassified as English proficient, including nearly double the reclassification rate by grade 9 (22% compared to 13%). The evaluation further found that higher implementation quality and program fidelity were associated with stronger student outcomes.

== Leadership ==
As of 2022, AVID’s chief executive officer is Thuan Nguyen; independent interviews and profiles discuss organizational strategy and professional learning priorities.

== Recognition ==
AVID has been recognized by school districts, municipalities, and state governments through official proclamations and observances acknowledging its contributions to education and college readiness.

AVID Day is an annual observance recognizing AVID educators, students, and alumni. It is typically held in September and features classroom activities, community participation, and public reflections on the program's impact under the theme “Because of AVID, I …”.

The state of Texas has formally recognized AVID's statewide impact. In 2025, the Texas Legislature issued a proclamation honoring AVID's 45-year legacy and designating September 12 as “AVID Day in Texas”. The proclamation cited AVID's presence in 161 districts and over 1,000 campuses serving more than 200,000 students, noting that 92% of Texas AVID seniors who applied to college were accepted.
