= Aarhus Convention =

UNECE Convention on Access to Information

The UNECE Convention on Access to Information, Public Participation in Decision-making and Access to Justice in Environmental Matters, usually known as the Aarhus Convention, was signed on 25 June 1998 in the Danish city of Aarhus. It entered into force on 30 October 2001. In April 2023, it had 49 parties—48 states and the European Union. All of the ratifying states are in Europe and Central Asia, with the exception of Guinea-Bissau. The EU has begun applying Aarhus-type principles in its legislation, notably the Water Framework Directive (Directive 2000/60/EC). Liechtenstein and Monaco have signed the convention but have not ratified it.

The Aarhus Convention grants the public rights regarding access to information, public participation and access to justice, in governmental decision-making processes on matters concerning the local, national and transboundary environment. It focuses on interactions between the public and public authorities.

Interpretation of the treaty is bound by the Vienna Convention on the Law of Treaties and the authoritative languages of the agreement are English, Russian and French.

== Content ==
The Aarhus Convention is a multilateral environmental agreement through which the opportunities for citizens to access environmental information are increased and transparent and reliable regulation procedure is secured. It is a way of enhancing the environmental governance network, introducing a reactive and trustworthy relationship between civil society and governments and adding the novelty of a mechanism created to empower the value of public participation in the decision-making process and guarantee access to justice: a "governance-by-disclosure" that leads a shift toward an environmentally responsible society. The Aarhus Convention was drafted by governments, with the participation of NGOs, and is legally binding for all the States who ratified it becoming Parties. Among the latter is included the EC, who therefore has the task to ensure compliance not only within the member States but also for its institutions, all those bodies who carry out public administrative duties. Each Party has the commitment to promote the principles contained in the convention and to fill out a national report, always embracing a consultative and transparent process.

=== General features ===
The Aarhus Convention is a rights-based approach: the intent is for the public to have awareness of the procedures for participation in environmental decision-making, have free access to them and know how to use them.

A distinction is made between "the public", all the civil society's actors, and the "public concerned" precisely, those persons or organisations affected or interested in environmental decision-making (e.g. environmental NGOs). "Public authorities" are the addressees of the convention, namely, governments, international institutions, and privatized bodies that have public responsibilities or act under the control of public bodies. The private sector, for which information disclosure depends on voluntary, non- mandatory practices, and bodies acting in a judicial or legislative capacity, are excluded.

Other significant provisions are the "non-discrimination" principle (all the information has to be provided without taking account of the nationality or citizenship of the applicant), the international nature of the convention, and the importance attributed to the promotion of environmental education of the public.

=== The Three Pillars ===
1. Access to information: any citizen should have the right to get a wide and easy access to environmental information. Public authorities must provide all the information required and collect and disseminate them and in a timely and transparent manner. They can refuse to do it only under particular situations (such as national defence);
2. Public participation in decision making: the public must be informed over all the relevant projects and it has to have the chance to participate during the decision-making and legislative process. Decision makers can take advantage from people's knowledge and expertise; this contribution is a strong opportunity to improve the quality of the environmental decisions, outcomes and to guarantee procedural legitimacy
3. Access to justice: the public has the right to judicial or administrative recourse procedures in case a Party violates or fails to adhere to environmental law and the convention's principles.

=== Further reflections ===
The Aarhus convention is a "proceduralisation of the environmental regulation", it focuses more on setting and listing procedures rather than establishing standards and specifying outcomes, permitting the parties involved to interpret and implement the convention on the systems and circumstances that characterize their nation. This model embodies a perfect example of a multi-level governance.

The risk could lay in a loss of time and resources that could be otherwise invested in defining the outcomes, notwithstanding the fact that it renders the convention vague, weak and open to multiple interpretations. Other critiques note the fact that private bodies are excluded from the mandatory procedures (Mason, 2010), and that, moreover, it can also be debated whether the NGOs involved are faithfully representing environmental interests, ordinary citizens often do not have the financial means to participate effectively and are therefore have no choice but to be represented by these larger organisations. The relative differences between the participants and social groups' resource inequalities also suggests the possibility for irregular and imbalanced environmental protection.

=== Compliance Committee ===
The Aarhus Convention Compliance Committee was established to fulfill the requirement of Article 15 of the convention on review of compliance to establish arrangements for reviewing compliance with the convention. The convention has a unique Compliance Review Mechanism, which can be triggered in four ways:

1. a Party makes a submission concerning its own compliance,
2. a Party makes a submission concerning another Party's compliance,
3. the Convention Secretariat makes a referral to the committee, or
4. a member of the public makes a communication concerning the compliance of a Party.

The Compliance mechanism is unique in international environmental law, as it allows members of the public to communicate concerns about a Party's compliance directly to a committee of international legal experts empowered to examine the merits of the case (the Aarhus Convention Compliance Committee). Nonetheless, the Compliance Committee cannot issue binding decisions, but rather makes recommendations to the full Meeting of the Parties (MoP). However, in practice, as MoPs occur infrequently, Parties attempt to comply with the recommendations of the Compliance Committee. As of August 2009, 41 communication from the public – many originating with non-governmental organizations – and one submission from a Party had been lodged with the convention's Compliance Committee.

=== Pollutant Release Protocol ===
The Kyiv Protocol on Pollutant Release and Transfer Registers to the Aarhus Convention was adopted at an extraordinary meeting of the Parties on 21 May 2003, in Kyiv, Ukraine. 36 states and the European Community signed the Protocol. As of July 2023, 38 parties had ratified the Protocol.

The Kyiv Protocol is the first legally binding international instrument on Pollutant Release and Transfer Registers (PRTRs). PRTRs are inventories of pollution from industrial sites and other sources such as agriculture and transport. The objective of the Protocol is "to enhance public access to information through the establishment of coherent, nationwide pollutant release and transfer registers (PRTRs)." The Protocol places indirect obligations on private enterprises to report annually to their national governments on their releases and transfers of pollutants.

Parties to the Protocol need not be parties to the convention. The Protocol is in this sense a free-standing, international agreement. The Kyiv Protocol on PRTRs will enter into force 90 days after the sixteenth State ratifies or accedes to the agreement.

=== Genetically Modified Organisms amendment ===
An amendment to the Aarhus Convention on "Public Participation in Decisions on Deliberate Release into the Environment and Placing on the Market of Genetically Modified Organisms" was adopted at the Second Meeting of the Parties on 27 May 2005, in Almaty, Kazakhstan. On 20 January 2025, Ukraine was the 33rd Party to ratify the GMO amendment, so that it entered into force on 20 April 2025.

== Reception, influence and implementation ==
United Nations Secretary-General Kofi Annan said in 2000, "Although regional in scope, the significance of the Aarhus Convention is global. It is by far the most impressive elaboration of principle 10 of the Rio Declaration, which stresses the need for citizens' participation in environmental issues and for access to information on the environment held by public authorities. As such it is the most ambitious venture in the area of environmental democracy so far undertaken under the auspices of the United Nations."

The influence of the Aarhus Convention extends beyond the environmental field. At the 2nd Internet Governance Forum, held on 12–15 May 2007, in Rio de Janeiro, the convention was presented as a model of public participation and transparency in the operation of international forums.

In the United Kingdom, the Convention is implemented through the Environmental Information Regulations 2004, which implements EU Directive 2003/4/EC. Following the UK's departure from the European Union, the Regulations continue to be binding through the European Union (Withdrawal) Act 2018, and the UK is a signatory in its own right. In part due to a decision of the Court of Justice of the European Union and domestic litigation, a special costs regime applies in England and Wales when bringing judicial review claims under the Aarhus Convention. The special costs regime does not apply to statutory claims, and the Court of Appeal has rejected litigation seeking to extend it to such claims. In 2024, the British government ordered a review into legal challenges against nationally significant infrastructure projects, which included the impact of the Aarhus Convention.

== See also ==
- Freedom of information legislation
- Participatory monitoring
- Action for Climate Empowerment
