= Effective group decision-making =

Theory of intercultural communication

The Effective Group Decision-Making Theory is one of several theories of intercultural communication.

== Decision-making ==
Developed in the 1990s by John G. Oetzel it focuses on decision-making within groups integrating also the Vigilant Interaction Theory (Hirokawa and Rost) as well as the Face Negotiation Theory by Ting-Toomey. Hirokawa was involved in another theory along with Denis Gouran on Functional Theory of Group Decision making in the 1980s. It takes the influence of culture on group processes as a basis and it depends on social interactions among group members. The purpose of this study which is to determine whether relationship between group interaction quality and group decision performance can be generalized to established organizational groups. Thus the theory presents different group constellations and their way of making decisions. Emphasizing the possible success Oetzels theory belongs to the theories focusing on effective outcomes. Oetzel states that groups making decisions can be homogeneous, i.e. monocultural or heterogeneous, i.e. multicultural. Within multicultural groups, there exist different decision-making strategies with the individuals due to the diverse cultural backgrounds. These different strategies may lead to conflicts in the process. The diverse backgrounds of the individuals will also result in different strategies for dealing with those conflicts. The effectiveness of a decision is dependent on the groups efforts to analyze and understand the specific task and objective at hand, and identify the positive and negatives of all alternative choices to find the best solution possible.

Vigilant Interaction Theory describes the group decision-making process as a series of interrelated sub-decisions leading to the final decision. According to the theory the quality of the final decision is based on 1)analysis of the problem/ situation 2) establishment of goals and objectives 3)evaluation of positive and negative qualities of the available choices. This theory shows that group decision performance is largely dependent on the wise group decision-makings from social interactions.

== Propositions ==
=== 1 through 7 ===
The theory contains 14 propositions as a core. Of those, the first half focuses on the influence of input on the process of decision-making. Here Oetzel assumes that individual members of homogeneous groups activate either independent self-construals (such members emphasize the quality decision and are not primarily interested in relationships among members) or interdependent self construals (those members are concerned for cooperation and others; the decision is secondary). Therefore homogeneous groups consisting of members that activate independent will take longer to reach a decision. The process is less cooperative and will have more conflicts than with homogeneous groups whose members activate interdependent self-construals. In addition to that, heterogeneous groups will less likely reach consensus than homogeneous groups since with homogeneous groups the single members are more committed to their group and that their contributions are treated more equally than in heterogeneous groups. Furthermore Oetzel claims that groups where the majority of members activate independent self-construals will most likely use dominating conflict-strategies, whereas with groups where most members use interdependent self-construals will use strategies of avoiding, compromising or obliging when dealing with conflicts.

=== 8 through 14 ===
Propositions 8 to 14 focus on the influence of the process on the outcome, i.e. on the decision. Those groups that use cooperative styles of conflict-management such as compromising make more effective decisions than those who use avoiding or competing styles as they put the group before the personal goals and have more creative solutions. Decisions will also be more effective in groups where members activate their personal identities. In groups were members activate social identities decisions will less effective since the different ideas of members are not used to their full extent and participation is unequal. This leads to the assumption that the more equal members in their groups are and the more committed individuals are to their group and to the decision the more effective the outcome will be. Therefore decisions reached by consensus are more effective than those made by majority for example. Finally the VIT’s “functional requisites” can predict the quality of decisions in mono- and multicultural groups. Those groups who meet these requisites will make decisions of higher quality.

However, not all propositions have been evaluated yet and Oetzel does not consider his theory finished.
