= Directive on public access to environmental information =

Directive 2003/4/EC
- European Union directive
- Title: Directive 2003/4/EC on public access to environmental information and repealing Council Directive 90/313/EEC
- Made by: European Parliament & Council
- Made under: Art. 251
- Journal reference: OJ L 41 of 14 February 2003, p. 26–32

History
- Date made: 28 January 2003
- Implementation date: 14 February 2005

Other legislation
- Replaces: Directive 90/313/EEC

The Directive on public access to environmental information (2003/4/EC) is a European Union directive with the formal title "Directive 2003/4/EC of the European Parliament and of the Council of 28 January 2003 on public access to environmental information and repealing Council Directive 90/313/EEC".

The purpose of the Directive is to ensure that environmental information is systematically available and distributed to the public. The Directive requires Member States to ensure that public authorities are required to make the environmental information they hold available to any legal or natural person on request.

In 1998, the European Community signed a Convention on access to information, public participation in decision-making and access to justice in environmental matters (the Aarhus Convention). The directive implements the Convention.

== Exceptions ==
Public authorities are required to release information on request subject to the following exceptions:

- the authority does not hold the requested information
- the request is manifestly unreasonable;
- the request is too general;
- the requested information is in the course of completion;
- the request concerns internal communications;
- the disclosure of the information would adversely affect:
  - the confidentiality of the proceedings of public authorities or of commercial or industrial information;
  - public security or national defence;
  - the course of justice;
  - intellectual property rights;
  - the confidentiality of personal data;
  - the interests of the person who supplied the information on a voluntary basis; or
  - the protection of the environment.

== Structure ==
- Recital
- Article 1 – Objectives
- Article 2 – Definitions
- Article 3 – Access to environmental information upon request
- Article 4 – Exceptions
- Article 5 – Charges
- Article 6 – Access to justice
- Article 7 – Dissemination of environmental information
- Article 8 – Quality of environmental information
- Article 9 – Review procedure
- Article 10 – Implementation
- Article 11 – Repeal
- Article 12 – Entry into force
- Article 13 – Addressees
- Annex – Correlation table

== Implementation ==
In the United Kingdom, the Directive was implemented by the Environmental Information Regulations 2004 and Environmental Information (Scotland) Regulations 2004. In the Republic of Ireland, the Directive has been implemented as the European Communities (Access to Information on the Environment) Regulations 2007.

== See also ==
- List of European Union directives
