= Official Information Act 2008 =

Law in the Cook Islands

The Official Information Act 2008 is a Cook Islands law passed to "make official information more freely available, [and] to establish procedures for the achievement of those purposes." The Act also repealed the Official Secrets Act 1951, which the Cook Islands had inherited from New Zealand.

The law was introduced into the Cook Islands Parliament on 12 February 2008, and passed two days later. It came into force on 11 February 2009.

== Summary of the Act ==
The law is heavily based on the New Zealand Official Information Act 1982. As in New Zealand, the definition of "official information" is extremely broad, covering any information held by a Ministry, a Minister in their official capacity, or a scheduled organisation. Information held by the courts, tribunals, commissions of inquiry, or investigative material held by the Ombudsman's office is excluded. Unlike New Zealand, the law applies to "any companies in which 50% or more of the shares are owned by the Crown," allowing the operations of crown-owned assets to be effectively monitored.

The scheme for deciding whether information is released or withheld also follows that of New Zealand. Decisions are governed by an overarching "principle of availability": "that... information shall be made available unless there is good reason for withholding it". "Good reason" is narrowly defined in the Act. Conclusive reasons for withholding information include national security or international relations, that it was supplied by another government in confidence, maintenance of the law, personal safety, or severe economic damage. Other reasons, which must be weighed against the public interest in release, include:

- protecting personal privacy;
- protecting trade secrets;
- protecting information given in confidence;
- protecting public health and safety;
- protecting New Zealand's economic interests, or members of the public from material loss;
- protecting the confidentiality of ministerial discussions and advice;
- protecting the "free and frank advice" of officials, and Ministers from harassment;
- legal or professional privilege;
- commercial confidentiality;
- allowing the government to conduct negotiations; or
- preventing the use of official information for "improper gain or improper advantage";

Requests can also be refused if release of the information would contravene the law or constitute contempt of court, or for administrative reasons (because the information will soon be made publicly available, that substantial research is required, or simply because it is vexatious). Organisations can charge for large requests.

Requests may be made by Cook Islands citizens or permanent residents, or people or corporations who have been resident or doing business in the Cook Islands for the past three years. Government organisations have 20 working days to respond, and if a request is refused in whole or in part, they must give reasons for the refusal. Decisions may be appealed to the Ombudsman.

The law also created a right to access and correct personal information held on a person by the government.
