= Official Information Act 1997 =

Law in Thailand

The Official Information Act 1997 (Thai: พระราชบัญญัติข้อมูลข่าวสารของราชการ พ.ศ. ๒๕๔๐) is a Thai act which guarantees the people's right to have full access to government information. It was approved by the Thai National Assembly in July 1997 and entered into application on 8 December 1997.

== Background ==
The constitutions of 1991 and 1997 had already recognised the right to information. The Official Information Act was passed at the same time as the 1997 constitution, and was designed to formally define the conditions of access to information. The Act was the culmination of a period of political reform which started in 1992 by popular protests in Bangkok against the government of General Suchinda Kraprayoon, and was precipitated by the 1997 Asian financial crisis in Thailand.

At the beginning of the latter, the government perpetuated the tradition of non-disclosure towards the public. When the gravity of the crisis became evident, its lack of credibility, especially after the seriousness of the crisis became apparent, an IMF intervention was welcomed since it was considered as a way to guarantee to the Thai public relevant information on the scope of the crisis and on official actions to limit its consequences.

This chain of events led to the adoption of an official Act in 1997. According to Alexandru Grigorescu, the act was less the result of IMF demands for transparency than a signal by the Thai government that future information it offered would be verifiable.

Thailand was the first country in Southeast Asia to implement a freedom of information law.

== Legal content and functioning ==
The Official Information Act guarantees people’s rights regarding official information (defined under section 4 as “information in possession or control of a State agency, whether it is the information relating to the operation of the State or the information relating to a private individual”), including the right to get advice (section 7), to inspect, to request a copy (section 9), and to ask the state to correct or change personal information (section 25).

The law functions essentially through three mechanisms :

- state agencies (defined under section 4 as “central administration, provincial administration, local administration, State enterprise, Government agency attached to the National Assembly, Court only in respect of the affairs unassociated with the trial and adjudication of cases”) are to publish a list of official information in an official “Government Gazette” (section 7)
- they are also to make available a list of official information for public inspection (section 9)
- finally, they are to provide any official information other than that already published in the Gazette or made available for public inspection upon individual request (section 11)

The act established the Official Information Board (OIB), the leader of which is to be appointed by the Prime Minister, and which is responsible for the implementation of the act.

=== Exemptions ===
A global principle states that state agencies are not to release information unless they are convinced that the request is necessary for the protection of the rights and liberties of an individual person or is beneficial to the public (section 11).

One absolute exemption exists: official information which could harm the interests of the Thai monarchy can never be disclosed (section 14).

Other exemptions exist, although they are not absolute, and thus may or may not be a motive for the prohibition of the disclosure of official information. They are listed under section 15 and include information which may jeopardize the national security or international relations, information which may endanger the life or safety of a person, and medical reports. A Royal Decree can at any time add an element to the list of exemptions.

=== Appeals ===
If the disclosure of official information is refused, the requester can, invoking section 18, either file a complaint at the OIB, or appeal through the OIB to the Information Disclosure Tribunal, which is composed of non-civil servants, and they have a total of 15 days to do so after they have received an order prohibiting the disclosure. An appeal to this tribunal is final (except when a further appeal is submitted to the administrative court).

== The Official Information Act in practice ==
A case involving Kasetsart University Demonstration School is often cited as a reference, and one of the first successful cases putting the Official Information Act in practice. In 1998, Sumalee Limpa-ovart requested to see the examination sheets and marks of the entrance test, after her daughter failed the test. Her request was rejected, and she filed a complaint at the OIB, which failed. She then appealed to the Information Disclosure Tribunal, which concluded that all the exam papers and marks were to be considered as official information. After having accessed the sheets, she realized that candidates with lower marks than her daughter had been admitted because of family connections. Consequently, Thailand's Ministry of University Affairs ordered a massive reform of admission procedures in the country. According to Andrew Harding and Peter Leyland, the case contributed greatly to the education system of the country.

Less successful applications were made to gain access to an official report on the popular protests of 1992 by newspapers and families whose relatives were killed during the events. After months of no response, the Ministry of Defence eventually released a report from 1992. However, it was, according to many of the victims' families, a “whitewash of events”, and the requesters were threatened of prosecution should the information be disseminated more widely.

== Effects ==
Two years after its implementation, in the concluding remarks of his report on the act, Nakorn Serirak argued that it was “a crucial component of democratic development as it encourages people to enjoy more political participation by directly expressing their opinions and proposing their needs or suggestions to the state”. More than half a million Thais utilized the Official Information Act in its first three years.

In 2000, following the creation of the OIB, the Bank of Thailand established an office to provide the public with access to financial and economic information.

The Thai government proclaimed 2002 the Year of Access to Official Information.

== Critiques and demand for refinement ==
Despite a relatively high number of requests, a lack of public awareness of the act is often deplored (and the fact that a majority of these requests are made by citizens, not by journalists).

A forum entitled “14 years of Thailand’s Official Information Act: Time for a Change” was organized in 2011 by the Southeast Asian Press Alliance (SEAPA). Thienchai Na Nakorn, Thailand’s Information Commissioner, acknowledged the existence of a culture of fear in the civil service that discouraged officials from providing information to the public, and that a reform of the act was necessary.

Another issue often raised regards time periods. When it has received a request, a State agency must reply “within a reasonable period of time” (section 11). This period of time is not defined precisely in the act, however Article 19’s report on the state of Thailand’s FOI law indicates that the term has been “interpreted rather liberally by State officials”. Their research has found that delays of months followed by a refusal to release without an explanation are not uncommon.

Thai journalist Kavi Chongkittavorn has published an article in The Nation (although it is not available on the newspaper's website anymore) also asking for a reform of the act, describing it as a “tale of disappointment, betrayal and procrastination”. He criticizes the fact that the OIB is, under section 27, under the control of the Prime Minister’s Office – and thus, part of the bureaucracy – rather than being an independent body like the Tribunal. In fact, the Board or its members do not have any specific duty to act independently.

Chongkittavorn also deplores the coordinated adaptation of state agencies to the implementation of the act :

“After some of the big fish were caught red-handed in the first three years, all government agencies were up in arms against the OIA in order to shield them from further disclosure and possibly prosecution. Understanding was reached among them that information disclosure would be at a snail’s pace to dissuade the public from using the OIA. Apparently, this strategy has been working unchallenged.”
