= Non-profit organizations and access to public information =

When government agencies outsource basic services to third-party non-profit contractors, one consequence is that the public may lose its access to information about the service that the public would have retained, had a government agency carried out the service directly.

A concern that previously public information will become privatized and inaccessible to the public when a government agency moves to contract out services to third-party vendors arises whether the third-party vendor is a non-profit organization or a for-profit organization. However, a number of key court cases in this area have arisen when non-profits have rebuffed requests for information under a state's right-to-know laws.

== Key court cases (U.S.) ==
=== Friends of Piedmont Park v. The Piedmont Park Conservancy ===
The Piedmont Park Conservancy is a private non-profit that oversees and manages Piedmont Park. In 2007, when the organization moved forward with a plan to install a controversial parking structure, a group opposed to the plan—Friends of Piedmont Park—filed an open record request under Georgia Georgia's open records legislation for records of the Conservancy. The request was declined, and the Friends group sued. On September 12, 2007, a Georgia judge ruled that the records must be made public.

=== The Times of Trenton v. Lafayette Yard Community Development Corp. ===
In this case, the New Jersey Supreme Court unanimously ruled in 2005 that Lafayette Yard CDC, a private non-profit, was subject to the provisions of New Jersey's open records (OPRA) legislation because it issued city-backed bonds and the majority of its board was appointed by the city council of Trenton. The litigation arose because the board of Lafayette Yard CDC kicked a reporter for the Trenton newspaper out of a meeting on the grounds that, as a private non-profit, they were not subject to open records or open meetings laws.

=== Gannon and Nichols v. the Board of Regents of the State of Iowa ===
In this 2005 case, the Iowa Supreme Court overturned a lower court and ruled that outsourcing a public function to a private board does not privatize the records of the private board. The court wrote, "In this appeal, we are asked to decide whether a government body may outsource one of its core functions to a private corporation, making that part of its operation nongovernmental and not subject to public scrutiny. We hold the Iowa State University Foundation, a recipient of such outsourcing, is performing a government function, and therefore its records are subject to disclosure."

=== Kimberly Kay Allen v. John Day ===
Fourteen cheerleaders sued Powers Management, a private company that ran a public stadium in Nashville, Tennessee, on the grounds that their privacy had been violated by two employees of Powers Management. Powers Management reached an out-of-court settlement with the cheerleaders. The Tennessean asked for a copy of the settlement from Powers, on the grounds that Powers was functionally a government agency. In 2006, a Tennessee appeals court agreed with The Tennessean, ordering Powers to turn over a copy of the settlement to the newspaper.

== Controversies ==
=== Downtown Vision in Jacksonville, Florida ===
Downtown Vision agreed in September 2007 that it falls under Florida's open records law. Previously, the organization had stated that it was exempt because it is a private not-for-profit corporation.

=== Charleston Area Alliance ===
The non-profit Charleston Area Alliance in West Virginia receives $100,000 annually from the Kanawha County Commission to provide economic development services to the county. However, the Charleston Area Alliance has refused to provide information about the salaries its officers receive, on the grounds that it is a private organization.

=== Medicaid service non-profits in Connecticut ===
In Connecticut, the state Department of Social Services contracted with three for-profit companies and one non-profit company for Medicaid services. Each organization refused to respond to Connecticut open records requests for information about how much they were paying doctors under the plans. The Connecticut Attorney General and Connecticut Freedom of Information Coalition ruled that the documents must be made public.

=== New Mexico State University Foundation ===
In New Mexico, the non-profit New Mexico State University Foundation is claiming that because it is private, it does not have to release the names of donors, even though the donors are partially funding the salaries of employees at New Mexico State University. Basketball coach Reggie Theus is one recipient of a salary partially funded by undisclosed private donors. Since Theus has spoken at a public governmental hearing in favor of a private real-estate development, questions have arisen about whether he is receiving part of his salary from those real estate developers.
