= Public Policy Forum =

Canadian think tank

The Public Policy Forum
- Forum des politiques publiques
- Abbreviation: PPF
- Formation: 1987; 39 years ago
- Type: Public policy think tank
- Legal status: Registered Charity 844430009 RR 0001
- Headquarters: 150 Elgin Street Ottawa, Ontario, Canada
- President & CEO: Inez Jabalpurwala
- Board of directors: Chair: André Beaulieu
- Staff: 29 (2025)
- Website: ppforum.ca

The Public Policy Forum (PPF) is an independent, non-profit Canadian think tank for public-private dialogue. The organization's purpose is to connect diverse participants in the policymaking process and to work with them to inform policy discussions. The PPF is a registered charity in Canada.

Its current president and CEO is Inez Jabalpurwala who manages a staff of approximately 30.

== History ==
The Forum was founded in 1987 by Shelly (Sheldon) Ehrenworth, Geoff Poapst, Max B.E. Clarkson and a group of public and private sector leaders in Toronto. In its early years, the Forum brought together leaders from business, the trade union movement, academe and the not-for-profit sector for meetings in cities across Canada. The idea was to share perspectives on public sector management questions and discuss ways to build a more collaborative approach to policy making.

The PPF has since grown to include about 200 organizations from business, federal and provincial governments, academia, organized labour and the voluntary and not-for-profit sectors.

== Governance ==
The PPF is a registered charity that is governed by a board of approximately 20 directors. The board is chaired by André Beaulieu.

== Activities ==
The PPF functions primarily as an independent, non-partisan facilitator of multi-sector dialogue.

=== Convening ===
In conjunction with members and partners from all sectors, the PPF convenes dialogues aimed at producing actionable outcomes in key policy areas, such as: innovation, public engagement, public service and governance.

=== Research ===
The PPF regularly produces and publishes research and reports in areas related to its policy dialogues. The Forum also conducts original research in areas such as public service innovation, government leadership, and media.

=== Annual Awards ===
- Testimonial Dinner Award to honour distinguished Canadians who have made an outstanding contribution to the quality of public policy and public management (1988-ongoing)
- Hyman Solomon Award to honour an outstanding Canadian journalist (1992-ongoing)
- Emerging Leader Award to recognize a young Canadian who personifies leadership in public policy and civic discourse (2005-ongoing)
- Global Laureate Award to recognize international leaders impacting the direction of policy in Canada (first award in May 2026)
- Frank McKenna Award, Atlantic Canada (2013-2024)
- Peter Lougheed Award, Western Canada (2011-2019)

Year	#	Testimonial Dinner Award	Hyman Solomon Award	Emerging Leader Award
2026	39	Arlene Dickinson, Christiane Germain, John Knubley, and (Global Laureate) Fatih Birol	Robert Fife	Bryan Detchou
2025	38	Anil Arora, Elizabeth Dowdeswell, Chief Crystal Smith, Marc-André Blanchard	Steve Paikin	Alfred Burgesson
2024	37	Jayna Hefford, Janice Charette, Murad Al-Katib, Jean Paul Gladu, Marc Garneau	Paul Wells	Raven Lacerte
2023	36	Harold Calla, John Risley, Laurent Duvernay-Tardif, Janice Stein, the Hon. Lisa Raitt	Stephanie Nolen	Naila Moloo
2022	35	The Hon. John Manley, Clarissa Desjardins, Deepa Mehta, Chief Terrance Paul	Mark MacKinnon	Autumn Peltier
2021	34	(Awards postponed to April 2022 due to the COVID-19 pandemic)		
2020	33	Elyse Allan, Sen. Peter Harder, Anne McLellan, Sen. Murray Sinclair	Rob Russo	Shingai Manjengwa
2019	32	Rona Ambrose, Alan Bernstein, George A. Cope, Pierre-Marc Johnson, Farah Mohamed	Karyn Pugliese	Maayan Ziv
2018	31	Mark Carney, The Right Hon. Beverley McLachlin, Michael Donovan, Mary Walsh, Richard Dicerni	Francine Pelletier	Caitlin Tolley
2017	30	Louise Arbour, Yaprak Baltacıoğlu, Dominic Barton, Johann Koss, Margaret MacMillan, Naheed Nenshi (30th Anniversary Event)	—	Alika Lafontaine (Indigenous Emerging Leader)
2016	29	Francoise Bertrand, Jack Mintz, Robert Prichard, Wayne Wouters	Peter Mansbridge	Taylor Owen
2015	28	Ed Clark, Peter Herrndorf, Roberta Jamieson, Michael Sabia	Serge Chapleau and Aislin (Terry Mosher)	Hannah Godefa
2014	27	Annette Verschuren, Mary Simon, Sheila Fraser, Heather Munroe-Blum	Susan Delacourt	Erin Freeland Ballantyne
2013	26	Honouring former Clerks of the Privy Council of Canada: Kevin Lynch, Alex Himelfarb, Mel Cappe, Jocelyne Bourgon, Paul Tellier	—	—
2012	25	Honouring former Prime Ministers of Canada: The Right Hons. Kim Campbell, Jean Chrétien, Joseph Clark, Paul Martin, Brian Mulroney, John Turner	—	—
2011	24	William G. Davis, Gordon Nixon, Monique F. Leroux, Jim Stanford	André Picard	Victor T. Thomas
2010	23	Tony Dean, Phil Fontaine, Preston Manning, Carole Taylor	Bernard Derome	Gabriel Bran Lopez
2009	22	Jim Balsillie, Mike Lazaridis, L. Jacques Ménard, Georgina Steinsky-Schwartz	Craig Oliver	Sara Ehrhardt
2008	21	David A. Dodge, Gerri Sinclair, Sheila Watt-Cloutier	Alain Dubuc	Peter MacLeod
2007	20	20th Anniversary Event (no awards given)	Eric Reguly	Parker Mitchell and George Roter
2006	19	Georges Erasmus, Louise Frechette, Bob Rae	Chantal Hébert	Alison Loat and Andrew Medd
2005	18	Monique Bégin, Bob White, Michael Wilson	Don Newman	Taylor Gunn
2004	17	Rita Burak, Denis Desautels, Roy Romanow, Allan Shaw	Mary Janigan	—
2003	16	Guy Colombe, Purdy Crawford, Henry Friesen, Chaviva Hosek, Don Mazankowski	Jim Travers	—
2002	15	Nellie Cournoyea, Pierre Lortie, Monica Patten, Milton Wong	Edward Greenspon	—
2001	14	Al Hatton, Hon. Peter Lougheed, Eric Newell, Manon Vennat	Madeleine Drohan	—
2000	13	Allan Blakeney, Raymond Garneau, Margaret Norrie McCain, Lynton "Red" Wilson	Bruce Little	—
1999	12	Jean Bernard, Thomas Edward Kierans, Donald Savoie, Thomas Shoyama	Jim Meek	—
1998	11	Jim Gray, Gaetan Lussier, Jean Pigott, Hon. Gordon Robertson	Vaugn Palmer	—
1997	10	Sheldon Ehrenworth (10th Anniversary Event)	Claude Picher	—
1996	9	A.W. (Al) Johnson, Guylaine Saucier, James D. Fleck	Jeffrey Simpson	—
1995	8	Jean-Claude Delorme, Claire Morris, Bill Blundell, Leo Gérard	Jason Moscovitz	—
1994	7	Allan Taylor, Louise Roy, Reg Basken, Bruce Rawson	Andrew Coyne	—
1993	6	Bertin Nadeau, Mickey Cohen, Judith Maxwell, James McCambly	Giles Gherson	—
1992	5	Guy Saint-Pierre, Chris Evans, Huguette Labelle, Arden Haynes	Graham Fraser	—
1991	4	Trevor Eyton, Claude Castonguay, Sylvia Ostry, Jack Munro	—	—
1990	3	Gordon Osbaldeston, Edward Stewart, Gérard Docquier, Michel Bélanger	—	—
1989	2	Arthur Kroeger, Robert Carman, David Golden, Jean de Grandpré	—	—
1988	1	Allen Lambert, Robert Bryce, Ted Newall, Paul Tellier	—	—
