= Ian Shugart =

Canadian politician (1957–2023)

The Honourable Ian Shugart PC

Canadian Senator from Ontario
- In office September 27, 2022 – October 25, 2023
- Nominated by: Justin Trudeau
- Appointed by: Mary Simon
- Preceded by: Jim Munson

24th Clerk of the Privy Council Secretary to the Cabinet
- In office April 19, 2019 – March 8, 2021
- Prime Minister: Justin Trudeau
- Preceded by: Michael Wernick
- Succeeded by: Janice Charette

Deputy minister positions
- 2016–2019: Deputy Minister for Foreign Affairs
- 2010–2016: Deputy Minister for Employment and Social Development
- 2008–2010: Deputy Minister for Environment Canada

Personal details
- Born: Ian Douglas Shugart; May 31, 1957 Toronto, Ontario, Canada
- Died: October 25, 2023 (aged 66)
- Party: Non-affiliated
- Education: Trinity College, Toronto (BA)
- Occupation: Public servant; politician
- Website: sencanada.ca/en/senators/shugart-ian/

Ian Douglas Shugart PC (May 31, 1957 – October 25, 2023) was a Canadian politician, professor, and public servant who served as a senator from Ontario from September 2022 until his death in October 2023. Prior to his appointment to the Senate, Shugart held a number of senior roles within the Public Service of Canada, including as the 24th clerk of the Privy Council and secretary to the Cabinet from 2019 to 2021.

== Education ==
Shugart graduated from Trinity College at the University of Toronto with a Bachelor of Arts in political economy.

== Career ==
=== Political staffer ===
Shugart began his career in Ottawa in 1980 as a political staffer, where he was a constitutional policy advisor to Progressive Conservative (PC) leader Joe Clark and later policy director under Brian Mulroney, when the PCs formed the Official Opposition. Mulroney formed government in 1984 and Shugart worked as a senior policy advisor to the minister of national health and welfare, Jake Epp. When Epp became minister of energy, mines and resources in 1989, Shugart became his chief of staff.

=== Public Service ===
In 1991, Shugart joined the Public Service of Canada, taking a job as the assistant secretary for the social policy and programs branch in the Federal-Provincial Relations Office. He would go on to serve in a number of roles in the federal government, including as the executive director of the Medical Research Council (1993–1997), as an assistant deputy minister with Health Canada (1997–2006), and as the associate deputy minister with Environment Canada (2006–2008).

Shugart was promoted to deputy minister for Environment Canada in 2006, where he supported international climate change negotiations and the regulation of greenhouse gas emissions. In 2010, he joined Employment and Social Development Canada as its deputy minister, where he worked on labour market and income security initiatives. He became deputy minister of foreign affairs at Global Affairs Canada in 2016, where he managed national security issues and bilateral relationships.

=== Clerk of the Privy Council ===
In 2019, Prime Minister Justin Trudeau announced that Shugart would become the 24th clerk of the Privy Council and secretary to the Cabinet – the head of the Public Service – following the resignation of Michael Wernick.

In 2021, Shugart stepped aside in order to receive cancer treatment. Former clerk Janice Charette, Canada's high commissioner to the United Kingdom assumed the role on an interim basis.

=== Senate ===
Ian Shugart was appointed to the Senate on September 26, 2022, by Prime Minister Justin Trudeau, after a career in government spanning over 40 years. Health issues delayed his maiden speech in the upper chamber until June 2023.

"Last week in this place, many honourable senators spoke about the risks to democracy in our country. Today, I would like to add what I hope might be a useful contribution to those observations," Shugart said. "I am going to speak about the idea of restraint — an idea, a discipline, that has proven essential in our constitutional and institutional development."

== Retirement ==
In 2022 Shugart retired and Janice Charette assumed the role of clerk.

Shugart joined the University of Toronto's Munk School of Global Affairs and Public Policy in May 2022 as a part-time professor.

On September 26, 2022, Shugart was sworn in as a member of the King's Privy Council for Canada.

== Death ==
Ian Shugart died on October 25, 2023, at the age of 66. His death was announced in the Senate that same day.
