= Janice Charette =

Clerk of the Privy Council

The Honourable Janice Charette PC OC
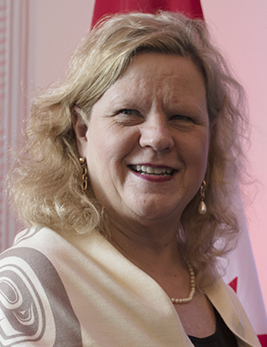
- Charette in London, 2019

Canadian Chief Trade Negotiator to the United States
- Incumbent
- Assumed office February 16, 2026
- Prime Minister: Mark Carney
- Preceded by: Position established

22nd Clerk of the Privy Council Secretary to the Cabinet
- In office May 25, 2022 – June 24, 2023
- Prime Minister: Justin Trudeau
- Succeeded by: John Hannaford
- Interim; March 9, 2021 – May 25, 2022
- Preceded by: Ian Shugart

Canadian High Commissioner to the United Kingdom
- In office July 19, 2016 – March 9, 2021
- Monarch: Elizabeth II
- Prime Minister: Justin Trudeau
- Preceded by: Gordon Campbell
- Succeeded by: Ralph Goodale

22nd Clerk of the Privy Council Secretary to the Cabinet
- In office October 6, 2014 – January 21, 2016
- Prime Minister: Stephen Harper; Justin Trudeau
- Preceded by: Wayne Wouters
- Succeeded by: Michael Wernick

Personal details
- Born: Ottawa, Ontario, Canada
- Spouse: Reg Charette
- Children: 2
- Education: Carleton University (BCom)
- Occupation: Civil servant; diplomat

Janice Charette is a Canadian public servant and diplomat who served as the 22nd clerk of the Privy Council from 2014 to 2016 and again from 2021 to 2023. From 2016 to 2021, between her two tenures as clerk, Charette was the Canadian high commissioner to the United Kingdom. She was named the Government of Canada's chief trade negotiator to the United States on February 16, 2026.

== Early and personal life ==
Born and raised in Ottawa, Ontario, Charette attended Carleton University, where she completed a Bachelor of Commerce degree. Charette is married to Reg Charette. Together they have two adult children.

== Career ==
Charette joined the public service in 1984, working in the Department of Finance.

- 1988 – 1989— Policy Analyst, Office of Privatization and Regulatory Affair.
- 1989 – 1991— Senior Departmental Assistant, Office of the Minister of Finance.
- 1991 – 1992— Senior Policy Adviser, Federal-Provincial Relations Office.
- 1992 – 1993— Senior Departmental Assistant, Office of the Minister of Finance, then Executive Assistant to the Chief of Staff, Office of the Prime Minister.
- 1994 – 1996— Co-ordinator, Base Closures Task Force, then Director of Operations, Program Review Secretariat, and executive director, Strategic Projects Unit, Privy Council Office.

She served as the deputy minister for Citizenship and Immigration Canada from 2004 until 2006, and as the deputy minister of Human Resources and Skills Development Canada from 2006 until 2010.

Charette was appointed as the clerk of the Privy Council and Secretary to the Cabinet on August 20, 2014, when Prime Minister Stephen Harper announced that she would replace Wayne Wouters, who served from 2009 to 2014. She is the second woman to have held that post, which is the top civil service position in the federal government.

On January 22, 2016, Prime Minister Justin Trudeau announced that Michael Wernick would replace Charette as clerk of the Privy Council. However, on July 19, 2016, she was appointed as the Canadian high commissioner to the United Kingdom.

On March 1, 2021, Trudeau announced that Charette would serve as interim clerk of the Privy Council Office starting on March 9, 2021, while the current clerk Ian Shugart underwent cancer treatment. She was permanently named to the position on May 25, 2022.

Prime Minister Trudeau said Charette, as Clerk of the Privy Council, had a significant influence on his decision to invoke the Emergencies Act during the 2022 Freedom Convoy protest in Ottawa. This use of the Emergencies Act was later determined in Federal Court to have been "unreasonable and ultra vires [beyond their legal authority], and that it infringed paragraph 2(b) and section 8 of the Canadian Charter of Rights and Freedoms" At the Public Order Emergency Commission investigating the decision, Trudeau said Charette's advice to invoke the Act played a large role in his decision: "But it was a big thing, not a small thing, to have the head of the public service formally recommend the invocation of the Emergencies Act and the declaration of a public order emergency." Trudeau added, "all the inputs in the system had come up to the Clerk of the Privy Council, the top public servant in Canada, impartial, professional public service making the recommendation to move forward on this. It was essential to me."

=== Volunteer work ===
Charette is a member of the board of directors of Royal Ottawa Healthcare Group and on the advisory board of the School of Policy Studies at Queen's University.

In 2008, she was national chair for the United Way's Government of Canada Workplace Charitable Campaign, raising over CA$136 million for communities and national health charities across Canada.

== Awards and recognition ==
In 2023, Charette was awarded an honorary Doctor of Laws from Carleton University.

She was made an Officer of the Order of Canada on December 31, 2025.
