= Michael Wernick =

Canadian retired public servant

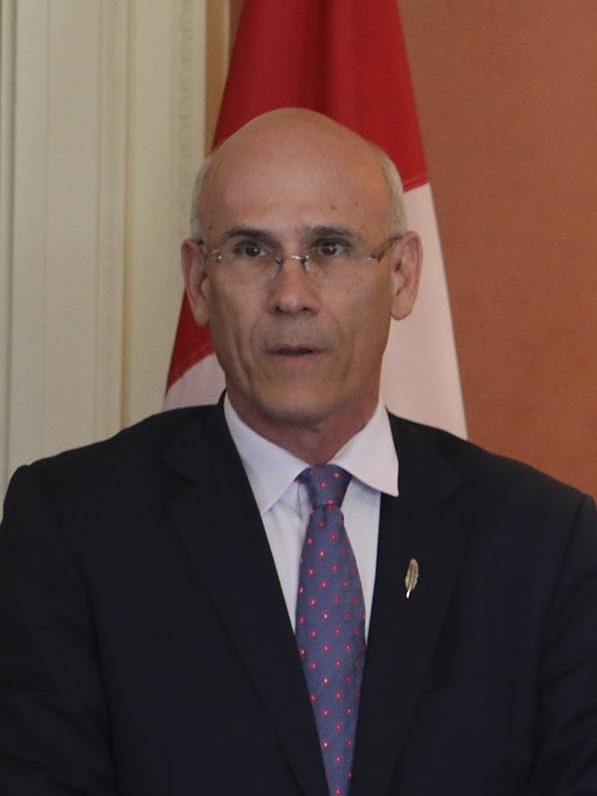
- Wernick in 2017

23rd Clerk of the Privy Council Secretary to the Cabinet
- In office January 22, 2016 – April 18, 2019
- Prime Minister: Justin Trudeau
- Preceded by: Janice Charette
- Succeeded by: Ian Shugart

Deputy Clerk of the Privy Council Associate Secretary to the Cabinet
- In office October 6, 2014 – January 21, 2016
- Preceded by: Janice Charette
- Succeeded by: Serge Dupont

Deputy Minister of Aboriginal Affairs and Northern Development
- In office May 5, 2006 – July 11, 2014
- Minister: Jim Prentice; Chuck Strahl; John Duncan; James Moore; Bernard Valcourt
- Succeeded by: Colleen Swords

Personal details
- Born: 1957 (age 68–69)
- Education: University of Toronto (BA, MA)
- Occupation: Public servant; academic; consultant

Michael Wernick (born September 1957) is a Canadian retired public servant who served as the 23rd clerk of the Privy Council for Canada from 2016 to 2019. Following his tenure as clerk, Wernick joined the University of Ottawa, where he was named Jarislowsky chair of public sector management.

Wernick joined the public service in 1981. Before becoming clerk, Wernick was the deputy clerk under Janice Charette. He was previously the deputy minister for the Department of Indian Affairs and Northern Development from May 2006 to July 11, 2014. He has held several other positions in the Privy Council Office and as associate deputy minister for the Department of Canadian Heritage.

== Career ==
Wernick joined the federal public service in June 1981 and worked at the Department of Finance until 1987. He worked at Privy Council Office from 1987 to 1990 and from 1991 to 1993 at the constitutional affairs unit of the Federal Provincial Relations Office, and in its successor unit when the Office was merged into the Privy Council Office in 1993, leaving in the summer of 1996. Wernick was deeply involved in the process leading up the Charlottetown Accord of August 1992, supporting the Cabinet Committee chaired by Joe Clark and chairing the multi-jurisdiction committee that drafted the political accord. He was the Assistant Secretary, Constitutional Affairs at Privy Council Office in the period leading to and including the 1995 Quebec referendum on secession.

From 1996 to 2002, Wernick was an assistant deputy minister at the Department of Canadian Heritage. He worked on cultural policy issues, including disputes surrounding Canadian cultural protectionism, such as surrounding film policy, copyright, and the trade dispute with the United States regarding the Canadian government's excise tax on "split-run" magazines (where a title whose main edition is published in another country, such as Time Magazine or Sports Illustrated, is republished in Canada with a few pages of special Canadian content, in order to take advantage of Canadian advertising sales revenues), as well as the entry of Amazon into the Canadian book market and music policy in the face of disruption of traditional industry practices by the internet. In 2002 his first appointment at the deputy minister level was as associate deputy minister at Canadian Heritage.

In 2003 he returned to the Privy Council Office as deputy secretary, where he supported the transition from Prime Minister Jean Chrétien to Paul Martin and later from Martin to Stephen Harper in 2006. Wernick attended the last meeting of the Chrétien Cabinet, the first and last meetings of the Martin Cabinet and the first meeting of the Harper Cabinet.

In May 2006 Wernick was appointed deputy minister for the Department of Indian and Northern Affairs, where he remained for eight years until June, 2014.He was appointed Deputy Clerk of the Privy Council in October, 2014 and Clerk of the Privy Council in January, 2016.

On March 18, 2019, Wernick announced that he would be retiring from his position as the clerk of the Privy Council amid the SNC-Lavalin affair. He retired from the federal public service on April 18, 2019.

=== SNC-Lavalin Affair ===
On February 7, 2019, The Globe and Mail published an article that spurred investigation into the SNC-Lavalin Affair. The article claimed that the Prime Minister's Office had pressured Jody Wilson-Raybould while she was Attorney General of Canada into pursuing a deferred prosecution agreement for SNC-Lavalin. The article also claimed that Wernick had rebuked Wilson-Raybould for having suggested that politicians had engaged in doublespeak on Indigenous issues. Wilson-Raybould resigned her current post as Minister of Veterans Affairs on February 12, 2019.

Wernick appeared before the House of Commons Justice Committee on February 21, 2019, where he disputed the allegations of undue pressure on Wilson-Raybould and stated that The Globe and Mail article contained errors and unfounded speculation. Wilson-Raybould testified on February 27 that Wernick was among those who had placed undue pressure on her and that Wernick had made "veiled threats" to her. This led to calls by opposition parties for Wernick's resignation. Wernick appeared at the Justice Committee for a second time on March 6 where he stated in his testimony that he had made no threats and had raised public interest considerations. Wernick announced his retirement in a letter to the prime minister on March 18. A secretly recorded telephone call between Wernick and Wilson-Raybould was released on March 29 wherein Wernick told Wilson-Raybould that Prime Minister Trudeau wanted a deferred prosecution agreement for SNC-Lavalin "one way or another". Wernick retired on April 19, 2019 and was succeeded by Ian Shugart.

On March 10, 2020, Ethics Commissioner Mario Dion, released his report on an allegation of conflict of interest against Wernick that had been referred to his office by the Public Sector integrity Commissioner. In the report Dion concluded "I do not have any reason to believe Mr. Wernick may have contravened section of the Act on the basis of the alleged facts. I will, therefore, not initiate an examination under section 45 of the Act and consider the matter closed."

== Post-retirement ==
=== Governing Canada ===
In October 2021, Wernick published a book titled Governing Canada; A Guide to the Tradecraft of Politics. Wernick described it as a "how to" rather than a tell-all style book, describing his audience as prospective politicians, public servants and academics.

=== Academic roles ===
From August 2020 to June 2022, Wernick was a fellow and adjunct professor at Carleton University's School of Public Policy and Administration. In May 2022, the University of Ottawa announced that he would take up an appointment as the Jarislowsky Chair in Public Sector Management on July 1, 2022. Wernick has contributed articles on a range of topics to Policy Options, Canadian Government Executive, Global Government Forum and was interviewed for podcasts and articles by the Globe and Mail, Hill Times, OMNItv, CTV, CBC TV and Radio, TVO, CFRA radio, RadioCanada and Journal de Montreal.
