= John Hannaford =

John Hannaford may refer to:

- John Hannaford (Australian politician)
- John Hannaford (Canadian civil servant)
