= Kevin G. Lynch =

Canadian civil servant and economist (born 1951)

The Honourable Kevin G. Lynch PC OC
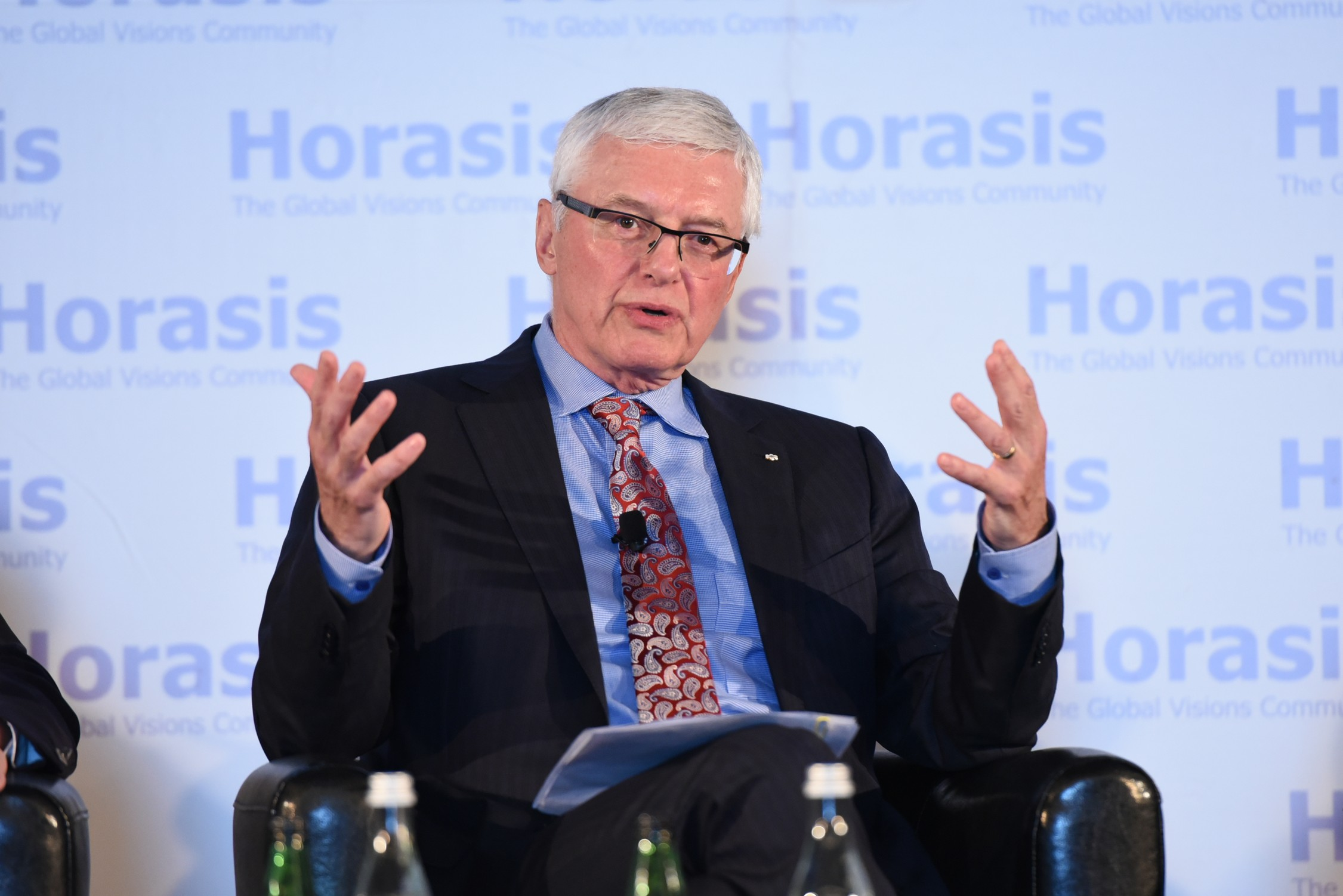
- Lynch speaking at the Horasis Global Meeting; Portuguese Riviera, 2017

Clerk of the Privy Council and Secretary to the Cabinet
- In office March 6, 2006 – June 30, 2009
- Prime Minister: Stephen Harper
- Preceded by: Alex Himelfarb
- Succeeded by: Wayne Wouters

Deputy Minister of Finance
- In office March 20, 2000 – October 31, 2004
- Minister: Paul Martin; John Manley; Ralph Goodale
- Preceded by: David A. Dodge
- Succeeded by: Ian Bennett

Deputy Minister of Industry
- In office October 16, 1995 – March 19, 2000
- Minister: John Manley
- Preceded by: Office established
- Succeeded by: Vernon Harder

Personal details
- Born: January 1951 (age 75) Sydney, Nova Scotia, Canada
- Education: Mount Allison University (BA); University of Manchester; McMaster University (PhD)

Kevin G. Lynch PC OC (born January 1951) is a Canadian economist and former Clerk of the Privy Council and Secretary to the Cabinet, Canada's most senior civil servant.

== Life and career ==
Born in Sydney, Nova Scotia, he received a Bachelor of Arts degree in economics from Mount Allison University, a Master of Economics degree from the University of Manchester, and a PhD in economics from McMaster University in 1980. He is married with two children.

Lynch began his career with the Bank of Canada as an economist in 1976. In 1981, he joined the Department of Finance and rose quickly through the ranks, becoming a Director in 1983 and an Assistant Deputy Minister in 1988. In 1992 he became Associate Deputy Minister at Industry and Deputy Minister of that department in 1995. In 2000, he returned to Finance, this time as Deputy Minister.

In 2004, he moved from Ottawa to Washington, DC, to serve as Executive Director for the Canadian, Irish and Caribbean constituency at the International Monetary Fund.

On March 6, 2006, he became the 20th Clerk of the Privy Council. On May 7, 2009, he announced that he would step down on July 1. He was replaced by Secretary of the Treasury Board Wayne Wouters.

On May 11, 2009, he was sworn in as a member of the Queen's Privy Council for Canada giving him the Pre-nominal title "The Honourable" and the Post-nominal letters "PC" for Life.

He is Chairman of SNC-Lavalin, the Montreal-based engineering company; Vice-Chair of the BMO Financial Group and the Chair of the Board of Governors of the University of Waterloo.

In 2011, he was made an Officer of the Order of Canada "for his contributions as a senior public servant, notably as head of Canada’s public service, and as a business leader and volunteer".

In September 2011, the Asia Pacific Foundation of Canada (APF Canada) and the Canada West Foundation established the Canada-Asia Energy Futures Task Force with Kevin G. Lynch and Kathleen (Kathy) E. Sendall, C.M., FCAE, a former Governor and Board Chair of the Canadian Association of Petroleum Producers (CAPP), as co-chairs, and to investigate a long-term Canada-Asia energy relationship. One of their recommendations was the creation of a public energy transportation corridor.

On July 1, 2013, Lynch became Chancellor of the University of King's College in Halifax, Nova Scotia.

On December 19, 2017, Lynch was named chairman of the board of directors of SNC-Lavalin.
