= Ernest Joseph Lemaire =

Ernest Joseph Lemaire CMG

6th Clerk of the Privy Council of Canada
- In office August 14, 1923 – January 1, 1940
- Preceded by: Rodolphe Boudreau
- Succeeded by: Arnold Danford Patrick Heeney

Private Secretary to the Prime Minister
- In office November 1904 – October 6, 1911

Personal details
- Born: October 22, 1874 Sherbrooke, Quebec, Canada
- Died: October 6, 1945 (aged 70)
- Education: St. Charles College, Sherbrooke

Ernest Joseph Lemaire, CMG (October 22, 1874 – October 6, 1945) was Clerk of the Privy Council of Canada, Secretary to the Cabinet and head of the Canadian civil service from August 14, 1923, to January 1, 1940. He was educated at St. Charles College, Sherbrooke and began his career in the civil service at the Privy Council Office in January 1894.

From 1904 to 1912 he was Private Secretary to Prime Minister Wilfrid Laurier and attended the Colonial Conference of 1907 and the Imperial Conference of 1911 with Laurier.

After Laurier left office Lemaire moved to the Post Office Department as Superintendent of the Postage Stamp Branch in 1912 and then, in 1921, he became the Superintendent of the Equipment and Supply Branch.

In 1923, Lemaire was promoted to Clerk of the Privy Council by Prime Minister William Lyon Mackenzie King.

In 1934, he was named a Companion of the Order of St Michael and St George.
