= Wayne Wouters =

Canadian politician

The Honourable Wayne G. Wouters PC OC

Clerk of the Privy Council and Secretary to the Cabinet
- In office July 1, 2009 – October 3, 2014
- Prime Minister: Stephen Harper
- Preceded by: Kevin G. Lynch
- Succeeded by: Janice Charette

Secretary of the Treasury Board
- In office December 20, 2004 – June 30, 2009
- Minister: Reg Alcock; John Baird; Vic Toews
- Preceded by: Jim Judd
- Succeeded by: Michelle d'Auray

Deputy Minister of Human Resources Development
- In office May 13, 2002 – 19 December 2004
- Minister: Jane Stewart
- Preceded by: Claire Morris
- Succeeded by: Nicole Jauvin (as Deputy Minister of Social Development)

Deputy Minister of Labour
- In office May 13, 2002 – December 11, 2003
- Minister: Claudette Bradshaw
- Preceded by: Claire Morris
- Succeeded by: Maryantonett Flumian

Deputy Minister of Fisheries and Oceans
- In office September 2, 1997 – May 12, 2002
- Minister: David Anderson; Herb Dhaliwal; Robert Thibault
- Preceded by: Bill Rowat
- Succeeded by: Peter Harrison

Personal details
- Born: April 1951 (age 75) Edam, Saskatchewan
- Education: University of Saskatchewan; Queen's University

Wayne G. Wouters, PC OC (born April 1951) is a Canadian former public servant and past Clerk of the Privy Council and Secretary to the Cabinet. He retired as Clerk on October 3, 2014, and was replaced by Janice Charette.

== Life and career ==
Wouters was born in Edam, Saskatchewan. He received his Bachelor of Commerce degree in economics from the University of Saskatchewan and his Master of Arts in economics from Queen's University.

Formerly a lecturer in political science and economics at the University of Saskatchewan, in 1977 he joined the Government of Saskatchewan rising to the position of Director of Energy Policy Branch, Department of Mineral Resources.

In 1982 he joined the Federal government and held various positions in the Department of Energy, Mines and Resources and the Department of Finance. By 1994, he had been appointed to senior positions within the Privy Council Office including, Assistant Secretary to the Cabinet (Program Review), and Head, Task Force on the Newfoundland Economy and Deputy Secretary to the Cabinet (Plans and Consultation).

In 1997, he was appointed Deputy Minister of Fisheries and Oceans and in 2002 became Deputy Minister of Human Resources Development and Deputy Minister of Labour. In 2003 he was also given the added responsibility of chairperson, Canada Employment Insurance Commission. In 2004, he was appointed Secretary of the Treasury Board.

On May 7, 2009, it was announced that he would be appointed Clerk of the Privy Council and secretary to the Cabinet to replace the retiring Kevin Lynch. His appointment became effective July 1, 2009.

Wouters was one of thirteen Canadians banned from traveling to Russia under retaliatory sanctions imposed by Russian president Vladimir Putin in March 2014.

=== Retirement ===
On August 19, 2014, Wouters announced that he would be retiring from the public service after a 37-year career. The next day, Prime Minister Stephen Harper announced that Janice Charette would replace him on October 6, 2014.

He was sworn in as a Member of the Queen's Privy Council for Canada on December 10, 2014.

On October 13, 2015, BlackBerry announced that Wouters has been added to its board of directors.

In June 2017, he was appointed as an Officer of the Order of Canada.
