= Section 102 of the Constitution Act, 1867 =

Provision of the Constitution of Canada

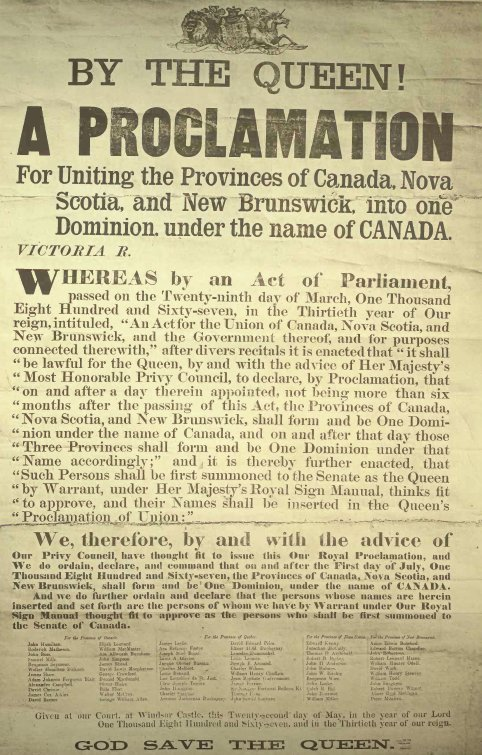
Proclamation bringing the Constitution Act into force, July 1, 1867

Section 102 of the Constitution Act, 1867 (French: article 102 de la Loi constitutionnelle de 1867) is a provision of the Constitution of Canada relating to the financial administration of the Government of Canada.

The Constitution Act, 1867 is the constitutional statute which established Canada. Originally named the British North America Act, 1867, the Act continues to be the foundational statute for the Constitution of Canada, although it has been amended many times since 1867. It is now recognised as part of the supreme law of Canada.

== Constitution Act, 1867 ==
The Constitution Act, 1867 is part of the Constitution of Canada and thus part of the supreme law of Canada. It was the product of extensive negotiations by the governments of the British North American provinces in the 1860s. The Act sets out the constitutional framework of Canada, including the structure of the federal government and the powers of the federal government and the provinces. Originally enacted in 1867 by the British Parliament under the name the British North America Act, 1867, in 1982 the Act was brought under full Canadian control through the Patriation of the Constitution, and was renamed the Constitution Act, 1867. Since Patriation the Act can only be amended in Canada, under the amending formula set out in the Constitution Act, 1982.

== Text of section 102 ==
Section 102 reads:

Creation of Consolidated Revenue Fund
102. All Duties and Revenues over which the respective Legislatures of Canada, Nova Scotia, and New Brunswick before and at the Union had and have Power of Appropriation, except such Portions thereof as are by this Act reserved to the respective Legislatures of the Provinces, or are raised by them in accordance with the special Powers conferred on them by this Act, shall form One Consolidated Revenue Fund, to be appropriated for the Public Service of Canada in the Manner and subject to the Charges in this Act provided.

Section 102 is found in Part VIII of the Constitution Act, 1867, dealing with revenues, debts, assets and taxation. It has not been amended since the Act was enacted in 1867.

== Purpose and interpretation ==
At the time of Confederation, custom duties were the primary revenue source for the British North American governments, based on customs acts enacted by each of the colonies. In Nova Scotia and New Brunswick, approximately 80% of revenue came from customs, while in the Province of Canada, approximately 66% of revenue was from customs. Under the new financial arrangements after Confederation, the federal government was to have exclusive authority to impose indirect taxes, such as customs duties. Section 102 of the Act recognised that all customs duties would belong to the federal government after Confederation, and therefore all revenues collected under pre-Confederation customs provisions were allocated to the federal government. As well, all existing provincial liquid assets from the provinces were transferred to the federal government, as part of the federal government's commitment to pay the debts of each province.

Section 102 provides that all of those liquid assets of the federal government, and future revenues, would be included in a single consolidated revenue fund, and that all payments made by the federal government would come out of that consolidated revenue fund. This approach was based on the financial reforms of the British government in the late 18th century, which created the consolidated fund of the British government.

Section 102 preserves the power of the provinces over the revenues which continue to be allocated to them under the powers set out in the Act.

The management of the federal Consolidated Revenue Fund is now governed by the Financial Administration Act.

== Related provisions ==
Section 103, section 104 and Section 105 of the Constitution Act, 1867 set out permanent charges on the Consolidated Revenue Fund, which had to be paid prior to any other federal expenditures.

Section 106 of the Act provides that all federal expenditures are to be made by appropriations on the Consolidated Revenue Fund, authorised by the Parliament of Canada.

Section 107 of the Act transferred liquid assets relating to the pre-Confederation debts of the provinces to the federal government.

Section 122 provided that the pre-Confederation customs and excise laws continued in force until altered by the federal Parliament.

Section 126 of the Act is the equivalent provision for the provinces, requiring each province to have a consolidated revenue fund.
