= William Henry Lee =

Canadian civil servant (1799–1878)

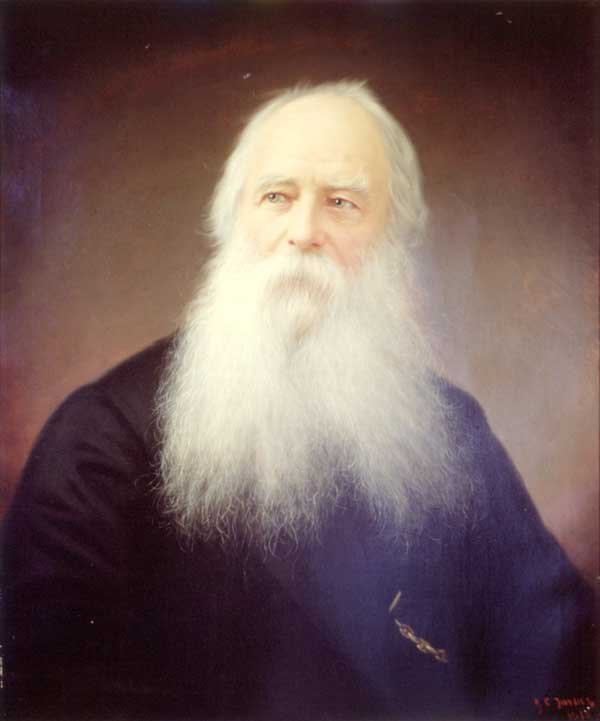

Clerk of the Privy Council
- In office July 1, 1867 – June 30, 1872
- Succeeded by: William Alfred Himsworth

Personal details
- Born: June 26, 1799 Trois-Rivières, Lower Canada
- Died: September 11, 1878 (aged 79) Ottawa, Ontario, Canada

William Henry Lee (June 26, 1799 – September 11, 1878) was a Canadian civil servant and the first Clerk of the Privy Council of Canada.

Born in Trois-Rivières, Lower Canada (now Quebec), he was educated in Montreal. In 1821, he became an extra clerk for the Executive Council of Upper Canada. From 1867 to 1872, he was the clerk of the Privy Council. Being the first Clerk of the Privy Council, he was a Father of Confederation.
