= William Alfred Himsworth =

Clerk of the Privy Council
- In office July 1, 1872 – January 7, 1880
- Preceded by: William Henry Lee
- Succeeded by: Joseph-Olivier Coté

Personal details
- Born: August 28, 1820 Trois-Rivières, Lower Canada
- Died: 1880 (aged 59–60) Ottawa, Ontario, Canada

William Alfred Himsworth (August 28, 1820 – 1880) was a Canadian civil servant and the Clerk of the Privy Council of Canada.

Born in Trois-Rivières, Lower Canada (now Quebec), he was educated at the college of Montreal and was called to the Lower Canada Bar in 1841. In 1867, he was the assistant clerk of the Privy Council for Canada and was clerk from 1872 to his death in 1880.

The Township of Himsworth (now Callander and Powassan) in Parry Sound District was named after him.
