= Mel Cappe =

Canadian civil servant and diplomat

Mel Cappe OC

Canadian High Commissioner to the United Kingdom
- In office 2002–2006
- Prime Minister: Jean Chrétien, Paul Martin, Stephen Harper
- Preceded by: Jeremy Kinsman
- Succeeded by: James R. Wright

Clerk of the Privy Council and Secretary to the Cabinet
- In office January 18, 1999 – May 12, 2002
- Prime Minister: Jean Chrétien
- Preceded by: Jocelyne Bourgon
- Succeeded by: Alex Himelfarb

Deputy Minister of Human Resources Development
- In office July 12, 1996 – January 17, 1999
- Minister: Doug Young; Pierre Pettigrew
- Preceded by: new office
- Succeeded by: Claire Morris

Deputy Minister of Labour
- In office July 12, 1996 – January 17, 1999
- Minister: Alfonso Gagliano; Lawrence MacAulay; Claudette Bradshaw
- Preceded by: new office
- Succeeded by: Claire Morris

Deputy Minister of the Environment
- In office May 9, 1994 – July 11, 1996
- Minister: Sheila Copps; Sergio Marchi
- Preceded by: Nick Mulder
- Succeeded by: Ian Glen

Personal details
- Born: December 3, 1948 (age 77) Toronto, Ontario, Canada
- Education: New College, Toronto; University of Western Ontario

Melvin Samuel Cappe, OC (born December 3, 1948) is a retired Canadian civil servant and diplomat. From 2006 to 2011, he was the president and CEO of the Institute for Research on Public Policy (IRPP) in Montreal, Quebec. He was most recently Canada's High Commissioner to the United Kingdom. He had served in Canada's government since 1975 as a deputy minister of Environment Canada, Human Resources Development and Labour, as well as Clerk of the Privy Council and Secretary to the Federal Cabinet.

== Biography ==
Born in Toronto, Ontario, Cappe received a Bachelor of Arts degree in economics in 1971 from New College, University of Toronto and a Master of Arts degree from the University of Western Ontario. He served as the Canadian High Commissioner to the United Kingdom from 2002 to 2006.

He is married to Marni and has two grown children, Danny and Emily.

In 2009, he was made an Officer of the Order of Canada "for his contributions to the federal public service, notably as a deputy minister, and as clerk of the Privy Council and as secretary to the Cabinet".

As of 2015, he is a professor at the University of Toronto's School of Public Policy and Governance where he teaches the capstone course and seminars on the role of government.
