= Alex Himelfarb =

Canadian civil servant and academic

Canadian Ambassador to Italy
- In office 2006–2009
- Minister: Peter MacKay
- Preceded by: Robert Fowler
- Succeeded by: James Fox

Clerk of the Privy Council and Secretary to the Cabinet
- In office May 13, 2002 – March 5, 2006
- Prime Minister: Jean Chrétien; Paul Martin; Stephen Harper
- Preceded by: Mel Cappe
- Succeeded by: Kevin Lynch

Deputy Minister of Canadian Heritage
- In office June 1, 1999 – May 12, 2002
- Minister: Sheila Copps
- Preceded by: Suzanne Hurtubise
- Succeeded by: Judith A. LaRocque

Personal details
- Born: July 3, 1947 (age 79) Germany
- Education: University of Toronto

Alexander Himelfarb (born July 3, 1947) is a Canadian former senior civil servant and academic.

== Career ==
=== As academic sociologist ===
Himelfarb started his career as a professor of sociology at the University of New Brunswick in 1972. He stayed at UNB until 1981.

With C. James Richardson, Himelfarb wrote two introductory textbooks on sociology: People, Power, and Process: Sociology for Canadians and People, Power and Process: A Reader (1979).

Himelfarb has published numerous monographs, chapters and articles on Canadian society and public policy and co-edited with his son Jordan the book Tax is Not a Four-Letter Word. His most recent book is Breaking Free of Neoliberalism: Canada’s Challenge published by Lorimer in 2024.

=== As civil servant ===
Himelfarb joined the Canadian public service in 1981 in the Department of the Solicitor General of Canada and served in senior positions in various departments and agencies, including the Parole Board of Canada, Justice, Citizenship and Immigration, the Privy Council Office, and Treasury Board, and led the Task Force on the Social Union. In 1999, he became deputy minister of Canadian heritage. In 2002 under Jean Chretien he was appointed to the dual role of clerk of the privy council and secretary to the cabinet.

On June 14, 2006, under Stephen Harper, Himelfarb was appointed ambassador to Italy, with concurrent accreditation to the Republic of Albania and the Republic of San Marino, and as High Commissioner in the Republic of Malta, and as permanent representative to the Food and Agriculture Organization, the World Food Programme and the International Fund for Agricultural Development, in Rome. He retired as ambassador in 2009.

=== As university administrator ===
In September 2009, Himelfarb was appointed as director of the Glendon School of Public and International Affairs, at Glendon College, York University. He retired from that position in 2014, when he was made director emeritus.

== Retirement years ==
Himelfarb is the founding chair of the Canadian Alliance to End Homelessness, based at York University. The organization, which follows the highly successful American model, originated in 2000 and focusses on 10-year Plans to End Homelessness and Housing First approaches. He retired from this position in 2018.

In 2016, Himelfarb was chair of the World Wildlife Fund Canada and of the Canadian Centre for Policy Alternatives (CCPA)'s Ontario Advisory Board. He chaired the Narwhal Board and the Steering Committee of CCPA (federal), was on the board of the Atkinson Foundation and is currently on the advisory committee of Social Capital Partners and the coordinating committee of Pledge for Canada. .

== Publications ==
- The Social Consequences of One-Industry Towns. (1977)
- People, Power and Process: Sociology for Canadians (McGraw-Hill Ryerson, 1979). ISBN 978-0-07082-865-0
- People, Power and Process: A Reader (McGraw-Hill Ryerson, 1980). ISBN 0070923493
- Tax Is Not a Four-Letter Word: A Different Take on Taxes in Canada (With Jordan Himelfarb; Wilfried Laurier University Press, 2013). ISBN 978-1-55458-903-6
- Breaking Free of Neoliberalism: Canada’s Challenge (Lorimer, 2024). ISBN 9781459419476

== Awards and recognition ==
In 2000, Himelfarb was awarded The Outstanding Achievement Award, considered the most prestigious award in the Canadian public service. In 2006, he was awarded an Honorary Fellow from the Royal Conservatory of Music and an Honorary Doctor of Laws degree by Memorial University of Newfoundland.

Diplomatic posts
Preceded by Jeremy Kinsman	Canadian Ambassador to Albania; 2006-2009	Succeeded by James Fox
Preceded by Robert Fowler	Canadian Ambassador to Italy; 2006-2009	Succeeded by James Fox
Preceded by Jeremy Kinsman	Canadian High Commissioner to Malta; 2006-2009	Succeeded by James Fox
