= Rita Burak =

Canadian public official (born 1946)

Rita Burak, O.Ont (born 15 June 1946) was the chair of the board of Hydro One until 2008 and a former Canadian public servant and independent consultant.

== Public service ==
Burak was born in New Jersey, United States and moved to Canada in 1968. She started as a private secretary in industry, and then began as a secretary for the Ontario Legislative Assembly in 1970. She returned to get her bachelor's degree in political science, which she received from Atkinson College, York University in 1977. By 1982 she was the executive director of finance and administration at the Ontario Ministry of Labor. In 1995 Burak was named as the head of civil service, and she held the position of secretary of the Cabinet for the Government of Ontario from 1995 to 2000. When Burak interviewed with Mike Harris, the newly-elected premier of Ontario for the cabinet secretary position, she brought a copy of his plan that had been written out as the Common Sense Revolution and said she could implement the plan. Her being appointed as cabinet secretary has been described as "an expression of the confidence in the public service's professionalism". Harris was impressed by her interest in working on his plans, and she was appointed as cabinet secretary with five days of Harris's election and in her new job she guided the transition team. She was the first woman to serve as Ontario's cabinet secretary. She was known for her focus on reducing duplicative efforts across offices, consolidating services within the ministry, and doing so in a financially responsible manner. While serving in the role of cabinet secretary, Burak opted to not vote in elections in order to maintain political neutrality in the public service. The Globe and Mail columnist John Ibbitson wrote in 2000 that "Cabinet secretaries are always powerful, if unquoted, figures in government, but few were more powerful than Ms. Burak."

Previously, she was Deputy Minister of Agriculture, Food and Rural Affairs and Assistant Deputy Minister in the Ministry of Housing.

When Burak stepped down as cabinet secretary she started a private consulting firm, The Network Executive Team.

Burak was appointed chair of Hydro One in 2003, serving first as an interim chair, and ultimately as chair until she stepped down in 2008. She also served as the chair of eHealth Ontario, stepping in to head the agency when issues arose about contracts with consultants, and continued to provide reports on means to improve the efficiency of agencies within the province of Ontario as recently as 2011.

== Awards ==
Burak is a recipient of the Order of Ontario (2001) and the Canadian Public Policy Forum's Annual Testimonial Award (2004).

== Personal life ==
Burak's spouse, Peter Barnes, was secretary of the Cabinet of Ontario from 1989 to 1992.
