= Clerk of the Privy Council (Canada) =

Senior civil servant in the Canadian government

Clerk of the Privy Council Secretary to the Cabinet
- Greffier du Conseil privé secrétaire du Cabinet
- Incumbent; Michael Sabia since July 7, 2025
- Government of Canada; Privy Council Office
- Type: Deputy minister
- Member of: Public Service of Canada
- Reports to: Prime Minister of Canada
- Appointer: Governor in Council; On the advice of the prime minister
- Inaugural holder: William Henry Lee
- Formation: July 1, 1867; 159 years ago
- Website: Privy Council webpage

The clerk of the Privy Council (French: greffier du Conseil privé) is the professional head of the Public Service of Canada. As the deputy minister for the Privy Council Office (the prime minister's department), the clerk is the senior civil servant in the Government of Canada and serves as the secretary to the Cabinet (French: secrétaire du Cabinet).

Michael Sabia has been the 26th clerk of the Privy Council since July 7, 2025. The clerk is a Governor-in-Council appointment made on the advice of the prime minister. The role of the clerk is nonpartisan; clerks may serve multiple prime ministers and do not belong to any political party. As the secretary to the Cabinet, the role provides impartial advice to the ministry and oversees the advice and policy support given to Cabinet and its committees. As head of the public service, the clerk is responsible for other deputy ministers and the provision of non-partisan, expert advice to the government as a whole.

In the provinces and territories, the equivalent position of senior public servant and deputy minister to the premier is called the cabinet secretary, secretary general, or clerk of the executive council (in French, secrétaire du conseil exécutif, secrétaire général, or greffier du conseil exécutif, respectively).

== History ==
The Privy Council for Canada was created and authorized by the Constitution Act, 1867, and there has been a clerk of the Privy Council since then.

The staff of the Privy Council increased from 142 to 352 between 1971 and 1975.

In 1989, reforms initiated by Prime Minister Brian Mulroney gave the clerk position its present day responsibilities. Expert Donald Savoie describes these as a combination of three roles: "the secretary of cabinet, the head of the non-partisan public service, and the deputy minister — or top bureaucrat — to the prime minister." One critique of this arrangement is that it could put senior nonpartisan officials in the position of taking partisan positions. Clerks generally have extensive previous experience in the Public Service of Canada before being appointed.

List of clerks of the Privy Council
#	Name	Start date	End date	Prime Minister	Notes
1	William Henry Lee	July 1, 1867	June 30, 1872	John A. Macdonald (1867–1873)	
2	William Alfred Himsworth	July 1, 1872	January 7, 1880	John A. Macdonald (1867–1873)	
2	William Alfred Himsworth	July 1, 1872	January 7, 1880	Alexander Mackenzie (1873–1878)	
2	William Alfred Himsworth	July 1, 1872	January 7, 1880	John A. Macdonald (1878–1891)	
3	Joseph Olivier Côté	January 13, 1880	April 24, 1882	John A. Macdonald (1878–1891)	
4	John Joseph McGee	May 20, 1882	May 5, 1907	John A. Macdonald (1878–1891)	
4	John Joseph McGee	May 20, 1882	May 5, 1907	John Abbott (1891–1892)	
4	John Joseph McGee	May 20, 1882	May 5, 1907	John Sparrow David Thompson (1892–1894)	
4	John Joseph McGee	May 20, 1882	May 5, 1907	Mackenzie Bowell (1894–1896)	
4	John Joseph McGee	May 20, 1882	May 5, 1907	Charles Tupper (1896–1896)	
4	John Joseph McGee	May 20, 1882	May 5, 1907	Wilfrid Laurier (1896–1911)	
5	Rodolphe Boudreau	May 6, 1907	August 4, 1923	Wilfrid Laurier (1896–1911)	
5	Rodolphe Boudreau	May 6, 1907	August 4, 1923	Robert Borden (1911–1920)	
5	Rodolphe Boudreau	May 6, 1907	August 4, 1923	Arthur Meighen (1920–1921)	
5	Rodolphe Boudreau	May 6, 1907	August 4, 1923	William Lyon Mackenzie King (1921–1926)	
6	Ernest Joseph Lemaire	August 14, 1923	January 1, 1940	William Lyon Mackenzie King (1921–1926)	
6	Ernest Joseph Lemaire	August 14, 1923	January 1, 1940	Arthur Meighen (1926–1926)	
6	Ernest Joseph Lemaire	August 14, 1923	January 1, 1940	William Lyon Mackenzie King (1926–1930)	
6	Ernest Joseph Lemaire	August 14, 1923	January 1, 1940	R. B. Bennett (1930–1935)	
6	Ernest Joseph Lemaire	August 14, 1923	January 1, 1940	William Lyon Mackenzie King (1935–1948)	
7	Arnold Danford Patrick Heeney	March 25, 1940	March 14, 1949	William Lyon Mackenzie King (1935–1948)	
7	Arnold Danford Patrick Heeney	March 25, 1940	March 14, 1949	Louis St. Laurent (1948–1957)	
8	Norman Alexander Robertson	March 15, 1949	May 31, 1952	Louis St. Laurent (1948–1957)	
9	John Witney Pickersgill	June 1, 1952	June 1, 1953	Louis St. Laurent (1948–1957)	
10	Robert Broughton Bryce	January 1, 1954	June 30, 1963	Louis St. Laurent (1948–1957)	
10	Robert Broughton Bryce	January 1, 1954	June 30, 1963	John Diefenbaker (1957–1963)	
10	Robert Broughton Bryce	January 1, 1954	June 30, 1963	Lester B. Pearson (1963–1968)	
11	Robert Gordon Robertson	July 1, 1963	January 15, 1975	Lester B. Pearson (1963–1968)	
11	Robert Gordon Robertson	July 1, 1963	January 15, 1975	Pierre Trudeau (1968–1979)	
12	Peter Michael Pitfield	January 16, 1975	June 4, 1979	Pierre Trudeau (1968–1979)	
13	Marcel Massé	June 5, 1979	March 10, 1980	Joe Clark (1979–1980)	
(12)	Peter Michael Pitfield	March 11, 1980	December 9, 1982	Pierre Trudeau (1980–1984)	(Note: Previously held office from 1975 to 1979.)
14	Gordon Francis Joseph Osbaldeston	December 10, 1982	August 11, 1985	Pierre Trudeau (1980–1984)	
14	Gordon Francis Joseph Osbaldeston	December 10, 1982	August 11, 1985	John Turner (1984–1984)	
14	Gordon Francis Joseph Osbaldeston	December 10, 1982	August 11, 1985	Brian Mulroney (1984–1993)	
15	Paul M. Tellier	August 12, 1985	June 30, 1992	Brian Mulroney (1984–1993)	
16	Glen Scott Shortliffe	July 1, 1992	March 27, 1994	Brian Mulroney (1984–1993)	
16	Glen Scott Shortliffe	July 1, 1992	March 27, 1994	Kim Campbell (1993–1993)	
16	Glen Scott Shortliffe	July 1, 1992	March 27, 1994	Jean Chrétien (1993–2003)	
17	Jocelyne Bourgon	March 28, 1994	January 17, 1999	Jean Chrétien (1993–2003)	
18	Mel Cappe	January 18, 1999	May 12, 2002	Jean Chrétien (1993–2003)	
19	Alex Himelfarb	May 13, 2002	March 5, 2006	Jean Chrétien (1993–2003)	
19	Alex Himelfarb	May 13, 2002	March 5, 2006	Paul Martin (2003–2006)	
19	Alex Himelfarb	May 13, 2002	March 5, 2006	Stephen Harper (2006–2015)	
20	Kevin G. Lynch	March 6, 2006	June 30, 2009	Stephen Harper (2006–2015)	
21	Wayne G. Wouters	July 1, 2009	October 3, 2014	Stephen Harper (2006–2015)	
22	Janice Charette	October 6, 2014	January 21, 2016	Stephen Harper (2006–2015)	
22	Janice Charette	October 6, 2014	January 21, 2016	Justin Trudeau (2015–2025)	
23	Michael Wernick	January 22, 2016	April 18, 2019	Justin Trudeau (2015–2025)	
24	Ian Shugart	April 19, 2019	May 27, 2022	Justin Trudeau (2015–2025)	
(22)	Janice Charette	May 28, 2022	June 23, 2023	Justin Trudeau (2015–2025)	(Note: Previously held office from 2014 to 2016. Interim Clerk from March 9, 2021, to May 28, 2022.)
25	John Hannaford	June 24, 2023	July 4, 2025	Justin Trudeau (2015–2025)	
25	John Hannaford	June 24, 2023	July 4, 2025	Mark Carney (2025–Present)	
26	Michael Sabia	July 7, 2025	incumbent	Mark Carney (2025–Present)	

== See also ==
- Clerk of the Privy Council (United Kingdom)
