= Section 126 of the Constitution Act, 1867 =

Provision of the Constitution of Canada

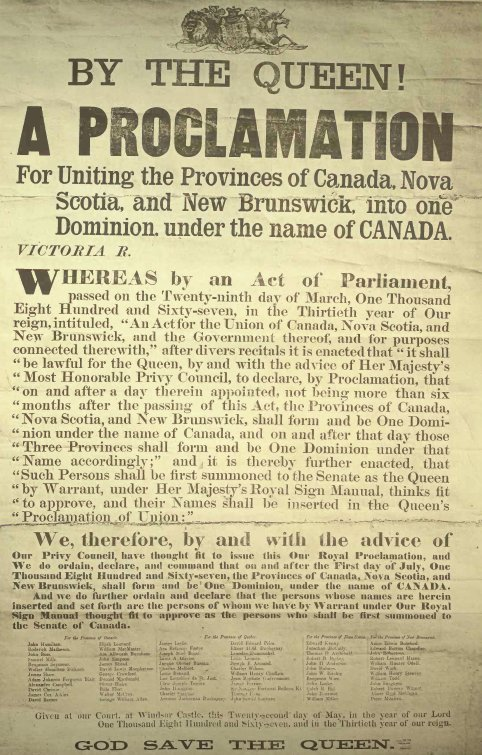
Royal Proclamation which brought the Act into force on July 1, 1867

Section 126 of the Constitution Act, 1867 (French: article 126 de la Loi constitutionnelle de 1867) is a provision of the Constitution of Canada relating to consolidated revenue funds of the provinces.

The Constitution Act, 1867 is the constitutional statute which established Canada. Originally named the British North America Act, 1867, the Act continues to be the foundational statute for the Constitution of Canada, although it has been amended many times since 1867. It is now recognised as part of the supreme law of Canada.

== Constitution Act, 1867 ==
The Constitution Act, 1867 is part of the Constitution of Canada and thus part of the supreme law of Canada. It was the product of extensive negotiations by the governments of the British North American provinces in the 1860s. The Act sets out the constitutional framework of Canada, including the structure of the federal government and the powers of the federal government and the provinces. Originally enacted in 1867 by the British Parliament under the name the British North America Act, 1867, in 1982 the Act was brought under full Canadian control through the Patriation of the Constitution, and was renamed the Constitution Act, 1867. Since Patriation the Act can only be amended in Canada, under the amending formula set out in the Constitution Act, 1982.

== Text of section 126 ==
Section 126 reads:

Provincial Consolidated Revenue Fund
126 Such Portions of the Duties and Revenues over which the respective Legislatures of Canada, Nova Scotia, and New Brunswick had before the Union Power of Appropriation as are by this Act reserved to the respective Governments or Legislatures of the Provinces, and all Duties and Revenues raised by them in accordance with the special Powers conferred upon them by this Act, shall in each Province form One Consolidated Revenue Fund to be appropriated for the Public Service of the Province.

Section 126 is found in Part VIII of the Constitution Act, 1867, dealing with revenues, debts, assets and taxation. It has not been amended since the Act was enacted in 1867.

== Purpose and interpretation ==
At Confederation, a large part of provincial assets were transferred to the federal government, in exchange for the federal government assuming the existing provincial debts, and providing federal subsidies to the provinces. Section 126 provides that each province is to maintain a consolidated revenue fund for all remaining provincial liquid assets, present and future. This approach was based on the financial reforms of the British government in the late 18th century, which created the consolidated fund of the British government.

== Related provisions ==
Section 102 of the Act is the federal equivalent to section 126, setting out the requirement for the federal consolidated revenue fund.

Each of the provinces maintains a consolidated revenue fund (or equivalent name) consistent with this section:

- Alberta: "general revenue fund"
- British Columbia: "consolidated revenue fund"
- Manitoba: "consolidated fund"
- New Brunswick: "consolidated fund"
- Newfoundland & Labrador: "consolidated revenue fund"
- Nova Scotia: "general revenue fund"
- Ontario: "consolidated revenue fund"
- Prince Edward Island: "operating fund"
- Quebec: "consolidated revenue fund"
- Saskatchewan: "general revenue fund"
