= Rodolphe Boudreau =

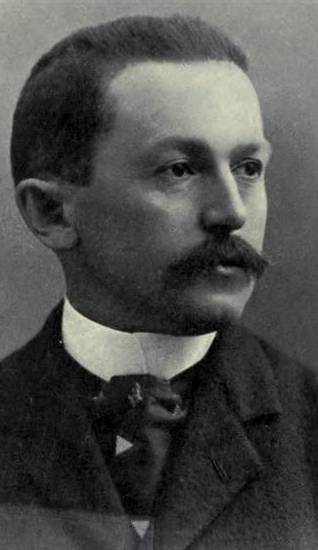

Clerk of the Privy Council
- In office 1907–1923
- Preceded by: John Joseph McGee
- Succeeded by: Ernest Joseph Lemaire

Personal details
- Born: September 19, 1865 St. Gregoire, Canada East
- Died: 1923 (aged 57–58)

Rodolphe Boudreau, CMG (September 19, 1865 – 1923) was a Canadian civil servant. He was the Clerk of the Privy Council, the senior civil servant in the government and the Secretary to the Canadian Cabinet, from 1907 to 1923.

Born in St. Gregoire, Canada East, the son of J. B. Boudreau and Sarah Fortier, Boudreau was educated at Nicolet College and Laval University. He entered the civil service in 1896 and was Private Secretary to Wilfrid Laurier from 1889 to 1907. In 1900, he was appointed Assistant Clerk of the Privy Council and became Clerk of the Privy Council in 1907. He served as Clerk until his death in 1923.

He was named Companion of the Order of St Michael and St George in 1918.
