= Department of Finance Canada =

Department of the Government of Canada

- Ministère des Finances Canada

Department overview
- Formed: July 1, 1867
- Type: Department responsible for: Economic and Fiscal Policy; Economic Development and Corporate Finance; Federal-Provincial Relations and Social Policy; Financial Sector Policy; International Trade and Finance; Tax Policy; Corporate Services
- Jurisdiction: Government of Canada
- Employees: 803 (March 2018)
- Annual budget: CA$94.1 billion (2018–19)
- Minister responsible: François-Philippe Champagne, Minister of Finance
- Department executive: Nick Leswick, Deputy Minister of Finance
- Website: fin.canada.ca

The Department of Finance Canada (French: Ministère des Finances Canada) is a central agency of the Government of Canada. The department assists the minister of finance in developing the government's fiscal framework and advises the government on economic and financial issues. A principal role of the department is assisting the government in the development of its annual budget.

The department is responsible to Parliament through the minister of finance (François-Philippe Champagne since March 2025). The day-to-day operations of the department are directed by the deputy minister of finance (a public servant). Nick Leswick was appointed Deputy Minister of Finance on December 19, 2025.

The department is headquartered in the James Michael Flaherty Building in downtown Ottawa at the corner of Elgin and Albert.

== Branches and sub-agencies ==
The department is divided into several branches:

- Economic Policy Branch
- Fiscal Policy Branch
- Economic Development and Corporate Finance Branch
- Federal-Provincial Relations and Social Policy Branch
- Financial Sector Policy Branch
- International Trade and Finance Branch
- Tax Policy Branch
- Law Branch
- Corporate Services Branch
- Consultations and Communications Branch

Some of the agencies under the finance portfolio include:

- Bank of Canada
- CPP Investment Board
- Office of the Superintendent of Financial Institutions
- Financial Consumer Agency of Canada
- Financial Transactions and Reports Analysis Centre of Canada
- Canada Deposit Insurance Corporation
- Canada Development Investment Corporation
- Royal Canadian Mint

== Related legislation ==
Acts and legislations under the Department:

- Income Tax Act
- Federal-Provincial Fiscal Arrangements Act
- Customs Act
- Customs Tariff Act
- Excise Act
- Excise Tax Act
- Proceeds of Crime (Money Laundering) and Terrorist Financing Act
- Income Tax Conventions Interpretation Act
- Payment Clearing and Settlement Act
- Financial Administration Act
- Special Import Measures Act
- Bretton Woods and Related Agreements Act
- European Bank for Reconstruction and Development Agreement Act
