= John Hannaford (Canadian civil servant) =

Canadian civil servant

The Honourable John Hannaford PC
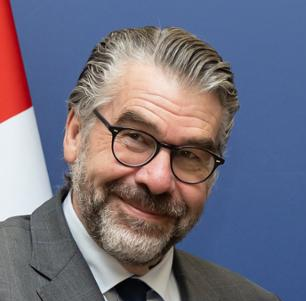
- Hannaford in 2025

25th Clerk of the Privy Council Secretary to the Cabinet
- In office June 24, 2023 – July 7, 2025
- Prime Minister: Justin Trudeau; Mark Carney
- Preceded by: Janice Charette
- Succeeded by: Michael Sabia

Personal representative of the prime minister to the European Union
- Incumbent
- Assumed office October 1, 2025
- Prime Minister: Mark Carney
- Preceded by: Stéphane Dion

Personal details
- Education: Queen's University (BA); London School of Economics (M.Sc); University of Toronto (LL.B.)

John Hannaford is a Canadian civil servant who served as the 25th clerk of the Privy Council and secretary to the Cabinet from June 24, 2023, to July 7, 2025. In October 2025, he was appointed by Prime Minister Mark Carney as his personal representative to the European Union.

== Education ==
Hannaford completed a bachelor of arts in history at Queen's University. He later completed a master of science, focusing on international relations, at the London School of Economics. He also completed a bachelor of laws at the University of Toronto.

== Career ==
His previous roles include:

- 2025–present: Personal representative of the prime minister to the European Union
- 2023–2025: Clerk of the Privy Council and Secretary to the Cabinet
- 2022–2023: Deputy minister of natural resources
- 2019–2022: Deputy minister of international trade
- 2015–2019: Foreign and defence policy advisor to the prime minister, Privy Council Office
- 2012–2015: Assistant secretary to the Cabinet (foreign and defence policy), Privy Council Office
- 2009–2012: Ambassador of Canada to Norway
- 2007–2009: Director general and deputy legal advisor, Foreign Affairs and International Trade Canada
- 2005–2007: Director, United Nations, Human Rights and Economic Law Division, Foreign Affairs and International Trade Canada
- 2003–2005: Deputy director, Trade Law Bureau, Foreign Affairs and International Trade Canada
- 2001–2003: Deputy director, Investment Trade Policy Division, Foreign Affairs and International Trade Canada

Hannaford was also involved at a high level in the renegotiation of NAFTA, and he was at one time a foreign and defense policy adviser to Justin Trudeau.

Hannaford was appointed as clerk following the retirement of Janice Charette on June 24, 2023.

Hannaford became a member of the King's Privy Council for Canada on July 4, 2025, shortly before the end of his tenure as clerk.
