= Consolidated Revenue Fund of Canada =

The Consolidated Revenue Fund of Canada (French: Fonds consolidé de revenu du Canada) is the account of the Government of Canada into which federal taxes and revenue are deposited, and from which funds are withdrawn in order to defray the costs of federal public services and other obligations. Funds are deposited and withdrawn by the Receiver General for Canada.

== Receiver General for Canada ==
Payments to and from the Consolidated Revenue Fund of Canada are made by the Receiver General. The minister of public services and procurement is the receiver general for Canada. The Department of Public Works and Government Services Act, 1996 states: "In the Minister's capacity as Receiver General, the Minister shall exercise all the powers and perform all the duties and functions assigned to the receiver general by law."

Cheques distributed by the Government of Canada to citizens and organizations are made in the name of the Receiver General, just as payments to the Government are made out to the same. The Receiver General by convention, however, never exercises any degree of discretion over payments to or from the Consolidated Revenue Fund, other than by following whatever directives might exist in relevant statutes and regulations.

== Establishing the fund ==
The Consolidated Revenue Fund of Canada is established by section 102 of the Constitution Act, 1867. The Act went on to stipulate several charges to be made to the fund, some of which were recurring charges, and continue to be withdrawn from the fund today, in accordance with the Act. The original balance of the fund was created from the consolidated financial resources of whatever revenue and taxation could be lawfully appropriated by the Legislatures of the provinces of Ontario, Quebec, New Brunswick and Nova Scotia. Taxes and revenue appropriated by the Government of Canada are deposited into the current Consolidated Revenue Fund.

=== The First Charge ===
The First Charge, established by Section 103 of the Constitution Act, 1867, is the cost of the actual maintenance of the Consolidated Revenue Fund itself. In accordance with the Act, the costs of collection, management and receipt of the fund are to be the first charge made to the account.

=== The Second Charge ===
The Second Charge, as established by Section 104 of the Act, was the annual interest on the provincial debts of the provinces of Canada, Nova Scotia and New Brunswick just before their union. The application of this second charge to the Consolidated Revenue Fund has since ended, in any practical sense. One could argue that the payment of the federal debt from the fund could constitute a modern variation on this Second Charge.

=== The Third Charge ===
The Third Charge, established by Section 105 of the Act, is the payment of the salary of the Governor General of Canada from the Consolidated Revenue Fund; by convention, this charge takes precedence over all others from the fund, even today. The current salary of the Governor General beginning on January 1, 2013 is $270,602 per annum.
