= Royal Commission on Government Organization =

- Also known as: Glassco Commission
- Commissioners: J. Grant Glassco (Chair); Robert Watson Sellar; F. Eugene Therrier
- Inquiry period: 16 September 1960 – 1963
- Authorized: Order in Council P.C. 1960-1269

The Royal Commission on Government Organization (also known as the Glassco Commission) was a Canadian Royal Commission appointed in 1960 to inquire into the organization of the Government of Canada. Chaired by businessman J. Grant Glassco, it issued a five volume report in 1962 and 1963 recommending that government departments be managed on a decentralized basis, that the Treasury Board be reorganized, and that senior management should rotate between departments.

== Recommendations ==
The Glassco recommended that the Dominion Bureau of Statistics should become an independent department whose independence should formally be recognised. This led to an Order in Council designating the Bureau as a federal department in January 1965. The Dominion Statistician would be the new department's Deputy Head.
