= Financial Administration Act =

Canadian law regulating government finance

Parliament of Canada
- Long title: An Act to provide for the financial administration of the Government of Canada, the establishment and maintenance of the accounts of Canada and the control of Crown corporations
- Citation: R.S.C., 1985, c. F-11
- Enacted by: Parliament of Canada
- Royal assent: December 21, 1951
- Commenced: October 1, 1952

Legislative history
- Introduced by: Alphonse Fournier on behalf of Douglas Abbott
- Introduced: November 15, 1951
- First reading: November 22, 1951
- Second reading: November 27, 1951
- Third reading: December 15, 1951
- First reading: December 17, 1951
- Second reading: December 17, 1951
- Third reading: December 18, 1951

Amends
- List of Versions

Summary
- Financial management of the government of Canada and Crown Corporations
- Status: In force

The Financial Administration Act (French: Loi sur la gestion des finances publiques) is legislation enacted by the Parliament of Canada, governing financial administration of the government, public assets, the estimates process, the Department of Finance, the Treasury Board of Canada and Crown Corporations. The Government of Canada has described the Act as the "cornerstone of the legal framework for general financial management and accountability of public service organizations and Crown corporations."

== Legislative history ==
=== 1951-52 version ===
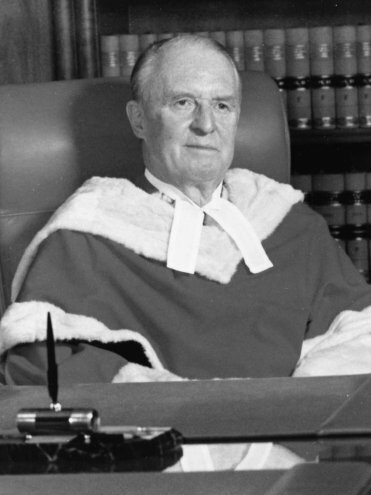
Douglas Abbott, Minister of Finance and mover of the first version of the modern act

The first version of the Act was moved as Bill 25 in 1951 by member of parliament and government house leader Alphonse Fournier on behalf of the Minister of Finance, Douglas Abbott during the 5th session of the 21st Canadian Parliament. According to Fournier, the intent was for the minister to introduce the legislation, but he was out of the country at the time, occupied with duties related to the then-nascent NATO. The bill followed a failed attempt at the same legislation in the fourth legislation that died on the order paper when parliament prorogued.

The legislation was intended as a consolidation of multiple pieces of existing legislation, including the Department of Finance and Treasury Board Act, acts related to Crown Corporations, and the Consolidated Revenue and Audit Act which originated in 1878 and had a substantial update in 1931 but in the opinion of a legislator had no substantial updates since. The legislation was also characterized as highly technical Some remnants of the Department of Finance and Treasury Board Act remained after consolidation.

The Act had multiple stated objectives, with one heavily featured in debated being the regularization of the relationship between the government and Canadian Crown Corporations. However, the Act was also intended to update and consolidate the government's procedures related to public borrowing, debt management, the comptroller general, to provide general debt relief on all debts incurred to the government before 1940, changing accounting practices with regard to government inventory, regularizing debt forgiveness procedures for the future, and modernization of the Treasury Board.

Some changes may also have stemmed from recommendations made by the auditor general Robert Sellar, possibly made in private correspondence to a single member. One such recommendation seemed to be whether the auditor general should be permitted to serve as auditor for Crown Corporations.

The bill received both debate when notice was given for the motion for the bill to be read a first time, by Fournier, and debate at first reading, which contrasts with modern practice. The bill was read for a first time on November 22.

Some Crown Corporations were exempted from the Act, either deliberately or due to the fact crown corporations had not yet been incorporated.

One major innovation in this Act was the development of the modern estimates process statutorily centred in Treasury Board and its secretariat that was absent in the Act of 1869, which was formerly centered instead at the cabinet level. Inaccuracies in estimations offered by the government had led to a larger than expected surplus in 1952, an item criticized by opposition leader George Drew, instigating interest in a more accurate estimates to avoid overtaxation without parliamentary approval.

After debate the bill was read a second time and referred to the public accounts committee, despite it being characterized as not having substantial organizational bandwidth to conduct the study. The report of the committee was considered section by section and passed third reading on December 15, and after receiving Senate approval, received Royal Assent on December 21, but has been at time categorized as either the Financial Administration Act of 1951 or 1952, as it was proclaimed and entered into force on October 1, 1952.

Senate approval was without major incident, was sponsored by Senator The Honourable Wishart McLea Robertson, leader of the government in the Senate for first reading on December 17. The second reading was moved by Senator Salter Hayden, with short debate and passed, also on December 17, and referred to the Banking and Commerce Committee. The committee considered the bill that night, and third reading was agreed to without amendment the following day.

=== 1985 Act ===
The Financial Administration Act received a minor update and a redesignation as the 1985 Act under the Mulroney government in the 33rd Parliament, as a part of a larger omnibus change to the Income Tax Act, pension legislation, unemployment insurance legislation and gas revenue legislation. The Act received only a small change under Part VI of the legislation. At the same time that the bill was being amended, the Financial Administration Act was invoked as something that should have led to parliamentary oversight of the privatisation of de Havilland Canada, which the government rejected, and did not succeed.

It received a series of technical amendments in 1990 centered around accountability of Crown Corporations, and speed of government payments to vendors.

The Act has since seen multiple changes every calendar year from 2003 to 2023.

== Statutory details and powers ==
=== Part I ===
==== Treasury Board and Treasury Board Secretariat ====
Part I of the Act establishes the Treasury Board, and the departments of the Treasury Board Secretariat. The Treasury Board is set at a size of five members of the Privy Council for Canada, and chaired by the President of the Treasury Board, and shall also consist of the Minister of Finance. It also establishes the Deputy Minister of the department, styled as the "Secretary of the Treasury Board", as well as designating the department as the structure that houses the Chief Information Officer of Canada, and the Comptroller General of Canada, both to be appointed by orders-in-council.

==== Responsibilities ====
Part I also lays out the responsibilities of the Treasury Board, including allowing it, non-exclusively and on behalf of the cabinet, to set administrative policy for the government, manage the estimates process, manage the negotiation of government contracts, conduct program reviews of other departments' programs, manage capital assets, manage human resources and human resources procedures, and to conduct internal audits. Beyond these core responsibilities, the cabinet retains the power to delegate other powers to the board.

The Act also gives the Treasury Board powers related to government pension plans, namely police, military and the public service. It also establishes that for each pension plan, the Treasury Board may establish a corporation governing each, and the formula for the composition of the Board of Directors

The Act also lays out limitations on the human resources power of the Board, specifically, the Act does not extend to powers otherwise delegated by legislation to the Public Service Commission or the Commissioner of the RCMP. The Act also establishes some powers which remain with the deputy ministers of other government departments, including setting departmental training regimens, discipline (including dismissal) and awarding of merit awards to their employees.

==== Department of Finance ====
Part I also establishes the Department of Finance, the role of the minister, and the role of the Deputy Minister of Finance.

==== Financial Responsibilities of Deputy Ministers ====
The Act provides the responsibilities of deputy heads of departments to provide financial accountability for public funds, including through internal audit, efficient deployment of resources and implementation of accounting controls and practices.

=== Part II ===
==== Receiver General ====
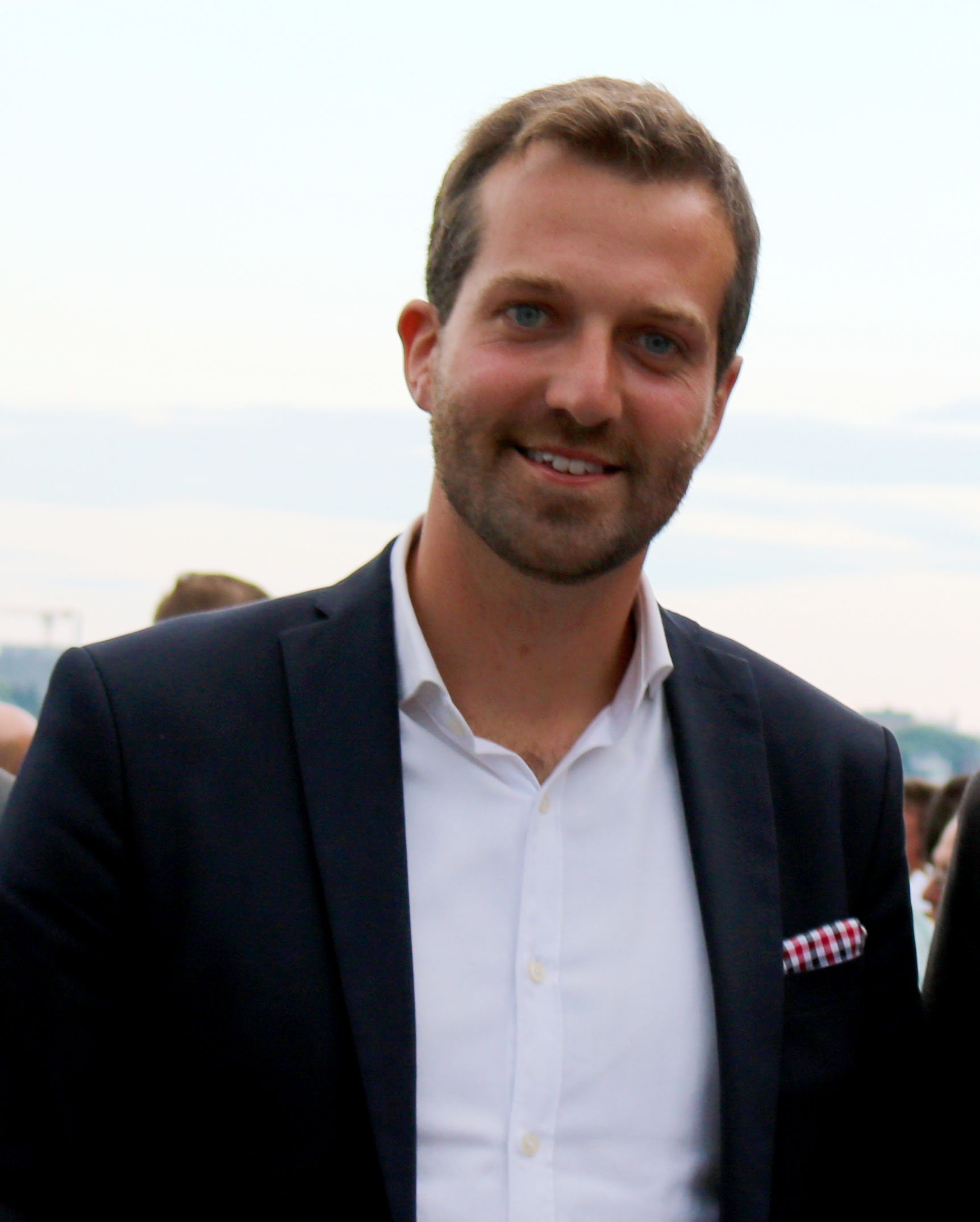
Joël Lightbound, the Receiver General for Canada

The Act establishes the responsibility of the Receiver General for Canada as the sole recipient of Canadian public moneys, its responsibility to record keep, and its ability to contract agents with a legal obligation to remit collected funds to the Receiver General. The Act also establishes that the Treasury Board may establish financial procedures governing the Receiver General.

==== Public money ====
The Act establishes the Consolidated Revenue Fund of Canada, under the responsibility of the Minister of Finance, and that it is to be used to pay out debts outstanding against the government.

=== Part III ===
==== Parliamentary Authority ====
Part III of the Act establishes that payments out of the consolidated revenue fund may not be conducted without parliamentary approval. This may occur through parliamentary approval of the estimates, a parliamentary approved contractual guarantee, or through parliamentary passage of legislation with mandated legislated spending. An exception is made for governmental departments spending revenues that it generates, but that parliament may optionally choose to designate through an appropriation act that revenues should count against the budget of that department.

In case of an election period and up to sixty days after, the Governor General, acting on advice of the Prime Minister, may approve special warrants (approvals of spending), if there is special need.

==== Payment Requirements ====
The Act establishes conditions that must be met by contractors prior to disbursement of funding, namely that the minister or their designate confirms the expenditure is deemed reasonable for the services rendered, or that a pre-existing contract has been signed setting the price. Disbursements must be paid out of the consolidated revenue fund and authorized by the Receiver General.

==== Contracts ====
Part III also governs government contracts. The Act necessitates each contract to have a clause declaring that payments are subject to parliamentary approval of spending for that purpose in each fiscal year covered by the contract.

The Act also allows the government to prohibit through regulation fees paid to those governed by the Lobbying Act, those convicted of corruption or fraud, or providing defective goods to the government in the past.

==== Five-Year Reviews ====
Each department in the government is mandated by the Act to carry out reviews every five years on the effectiveness of each of its programs, except for those exempted by the Treasury Board, which currently exempts programs spending less than $5 million per year, or spending on memberships or contributions to international organizations.

=== Part IV ===
==== Borrowing of Funds ====
The Act provides that debts can only be incurred by the government when authorized by law, and may also only occur through the governor-in-council then authorizing the Minister of Finance to borrow the funds. It provides that the parliament should establish each year a maximum borrowing limit that the Minister of Finance may not exceed. The Act does not limit the debt instruments nor currency used to raise funds. There is a minor exemption that was made during 2020 until September 2020 that the Minister could make any payments required to stabilize the financial system of Canada. It also establishes mandatory reporting of the minister to parliament of how they plan to manage the debt.

==== Stability of the Financial System ====
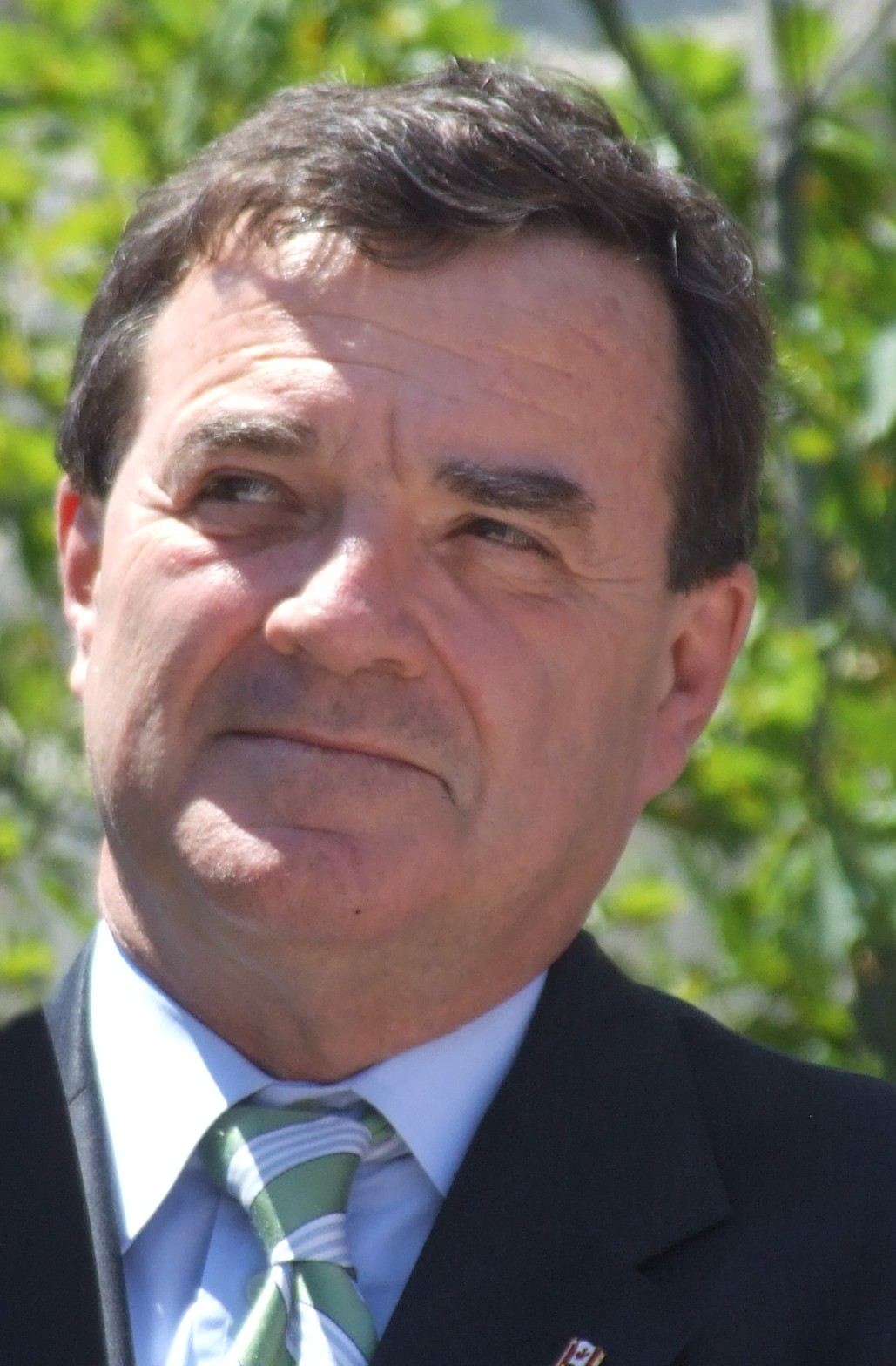
Finance Minister Jim Flaherty, who both procured and sold shares in General Motors (Canada), which is permitted under the Act.

The Act permits the Minister of Finance, operating with governor-in-council approval, to stabilize the financial system of Canada, including through purchase, holding or sale of private securities, offering loans or lines of credit, issuing loan guarantees, or providing insurance on financial instruments. There are exemptions, including the inability of the government to hold shares in any federally regulated bank, trust or loan company, or insurance company.

The government is also authorized to create corporations held by the Minister of Finance, provide directives to that corporation, and provide funding to that corporation, but that the corporation is not necessarily an extension of the legal person of the Canadian Crown.

=== Part V ===
==== Public Property ====
The Act establishes that rules governing leases or transfers of federal property are governed by the Federal Real Property and Federal Immovables Act, that the Treasury Board may regulate property in line with that Act, and that deputy ministers are responsible with upholding treasury board regulations.

=== Part VI ===
==== Public Accounting ====
The Act governs the Public Accounts of Canada, which are mandatory records kept by the Receiver General that show actual expenditures against each appropriation, revenues, and other transactions related to the consolidated revenue fund. Records are to be made in Canadian dollars, and reports are to be made quarterly.

=== Part VII ===
==== Assignability of Debt Payable ====
Crown debt can not be assigned (transferred) from one person to another unless explicitly permitted by law. The Act also provides for the authorization of some transfers provided notice is provided, but this may not extend to amounts related to pay, as well as allowing the government to make regulations related to transferability.

=== Part VIII ===
==== Assignability of Debt Receivable ====
Where the crown holds a payment bond to ensure the completion of a work, subcontractors of the contractor are entitled to claim against that bond if the contractor does not pay them what they are entitled to, thereby decreasing the total amount that may be given to the contractor at the completion of their work.

=== Part IX ===
==== Civil Liability ====
Part IX of the Act establishes that if a minister or the Receiver General believes a corporation or person has inappropriately received public moneys, they or their estate may be forced to remit that money, plus interest.

==== Criminal Liability ====
Public officials who receive kickbacks, commit financial fraud against the government, deliberately misrecord records, obscure fraud or extorts money using their position are guilty of an indictable offence and can be imprisoned for up to five years if convicted. If the amount of financial gain was over five thousand dollars, they can be fined an amount equal to the financial gain, or in the case of bribery, up to three times the amount of the bribe. In general, due to duplicate provisions under the Criminal Code, actions are rarely taken to use this criminal authority under this act.

=== Part X ===
==== Crown Corporations ====
The Act establishes the structure for Crown Corporations, which are owned by the Crown, and wholly owned crown subsidiaries, which are owned by crown corporations. Each corporation is responsible to parliament through individual ministerial responsibility through their respective minister, who can issue directives which direct the action of the Crown Corporation, and which the Crown Corporation is obligated to carry out. Crown Corporations can be authorized by law to be considered an agent of the Crown, capable of entering into contracts on behalf of the government.

These corporations have limitations on disposing of assets, with many kinds requiring governor-in-council approval first. This also includes selling-off of shares or the entire corporation.

There are some Crown Corporations to which some of the Act does not apply, notably the Canada Pension Plan Investment Board and the Bank of Canada.

==== Directors ====
Each Crown Corporation requires a chief executive, who sits on the Board of Directors. The Act also establishes the four-year maximum term of the other directors, which is renewable. The Board of Directors is responsible for managing the corporation and sit as fiduciaries appointed by the governor-in-council. Boards of directors can make by-laws for the corporation, which can be repealed or otherwise altered by the governor-in-council.

Directors have a heightened duty to not defraud the government, and are subject to up to fourteen years imprisonment if convicted of an offence.

==== Documents and Planning ====
The corporation's board of directors is responsible for preparing annual financial statements and corporate plans for their relevant minister.

==== Borrowing and Surpluses ====
Corporations are permitted by the Act to borrow, with the permission of the Minister of Finance. If surpluses are recorded, they may be transmitted to the Receiver General and treated as governmental revenues.

==== Accounting and Auditing ====
Each corporation is required to maintain internal records and audits, as well as quarterly financial reports. There is also a requirement to have an external auditor for each crown corporation and subsidiary, and it is by default the Auditor General of Canada, unless the Auditor General waives their first right to appointment. There is also a requirement that the Boards of Directors to form an audit committee to receive and action the auditor's report.

=== Part XI ===
==== Payment Discrepancies ====
Part XI, which deals with miscellaneous parts of the Act, deals with cases of minor amounts owing to the government, and permits the Receiver General to recover outstanding debts, or for debts to be waived with permission of a relevant minister.

== Regulation ==
The Act has over one hundred regulations and orders, with most of them being special purpose regulations. Notable general purpose regulations that engage with statutory language that invites their creation include those on debt write-offs, general crown corporation regulations, a regulation governing corporate plans, interest and administrative charges regulations, and others.

== Media coverage ==
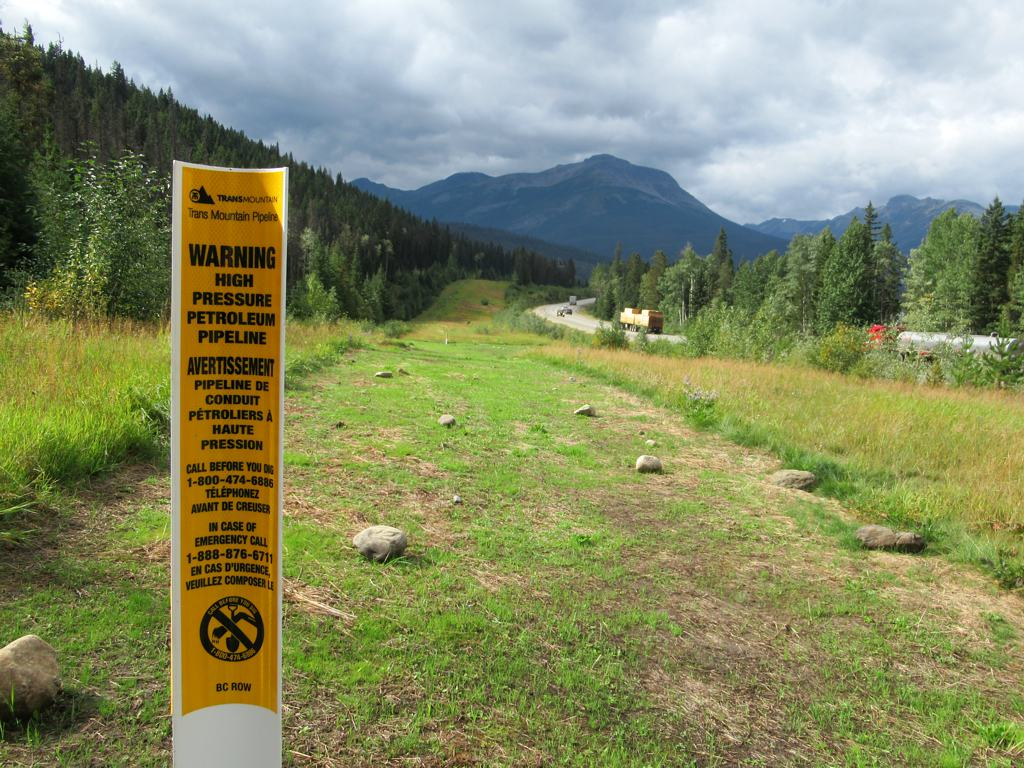
The Trans-Mountain Pipeline is owned by a Crown Corporation governed by the Act

The Act receives occasional media coverage due to its influence on government practices.

In some cases, it can be due to the practices of crown corporations and government's treatment of them. For example in 2022, a reclassification of the Trans Mountain Corporation, the crown corporation responsible for the Trans Mountain Pipeline, gave it more license to conduct borrowing without government oversight, which was criticized by the NDP opposition party. A similar move exempting the Canada Growth Fund from oversight was also criticized in 2022.

In some cases, controversy may be linked to borrowing. In 2020, as part of its response to the COVID-19 pandemic, the government proposed spending and borrowing power without explicit parliamentary approval for a period of 21 months, a proposal which quickly was pushed back on and revised to only apply for only a few months.

Section 19 of the Act became the basis of a large class action suit against the government regarding the cost of processing immigration visas, as the fee was set higher than cost recovery without an authorization by the governor-in-council. The case was ongoing as of 2022.
