= Deputy minister (Canada) =

Senior civil servant

Deputy Minister Sous-ministre

Occupation
- Names: Deputy minister, deputy head
- Occupation type: Senior public servant
- Activity sectors: Government of Canada; provincial and territorial administrations

Description
- Competencies: Strategic advice; Public administration
- Related jobs: Government minister; Director general; Chief executive officer; General; Admiral

In Canada, a deputy minister (DM; French: sous-ministre) is the senior civil servant in a government organization, who acts as deputy head. Deputy ministers take political direction from a minister of the Crown, who is typically an elected member of Parliament and responsible for the department.

The Canadian position is equivalent to the position of permanent secretary in the United Kingdom and the Australian position of departmental secretary. This position should not be confused with the deputy prime minister of Canada, who is not a civil servant at all, but a politician and senior member of the Cabinet.

Much of the current management structure of the Government of Canada – including the role of deputy heads – originates from the Royal Commission on Government Organization, also known as the Glassco Commission.

The title is not only used for the federal (national) government, but also for equivalent positions in the provincial and territorial governments.

== Role ==
A deputy minister has responsibility for a department's day-to-day operations, budget, and program development. As members of the public service, deputy ministers are nonpartisan. The deputy minister is the functional head of the department in question, while the minister is the department's political master. Unlike most other public service positions, deputy ministers are Governor-in-Council appointments made on the advice of the prime minister of Canada. Accordingly, deputy ministers can sometimes lose their positions as a result of a change of the party in power, particularly if they are seen as too closely identified with the policies of the previous government.

=== Statutory role ===
Under the Interpretation Act and departmental legislation, deputy heads are typically permitted to exercise powers of their ministers for all purposes aside from creation of regulations. Deputy heads also possess powers under their own right under the Financial Administration Act, Public Service Employment Act, powers delegated by the Treasury Board of Canada, and Public Service Commission of Canada. Typically, these relate to management of resources delegated to their organizations, personnel management, including appointment, employer-employee relations, and the organization of the department. Ministers may not provide specific direction on the areas a deputy minister is directly assigned.

=== Senior public servants ===
The executive government (Crown-in-Council) includes many organizations not designated as departments including special operating agencies – such as Statistics Canada, Parks Canada – the military, departments which function more as an "administrative umbrella", such as Public Safety Canada, which comprises six agencies, as well as Crown corporations. As such, various organizations' senior leadership (commissioner, chief executive, etc.) while not explicitly deputy ministers, exercise similar functions.

== Clerk of the Privy Council ==
The most senior deputy minister in the Canadian federal government is the clerk of the Privy Council, who is deputy minister to the Prime Minister and head of the Public Service of Canada. In the provinces and territories, the position fulfils a similar function as the most senior public servant and is called the cabinet secretary or clerk of the executive council. This person, along with their staff, typically develops agendas for regular Cabinet meetings, reconciles differences between departments, guides major policy initiatives, and coordinates the appointments of departmental heads. The position reports directly to the relevant prime minister and is typically among the most seasoned, influential, and low profile of public servants.

The Australian equivalent is the secretary of the Department of Prime Minister and Cabinet, and the British equivalent is the Cabinet Secretary. The equivalent in the provincial governments of Canada is the named "Deputy Minister of Executive Council and Secretary to Cabinet" (Alberta), "Deputy Minister to the Premier and Cabinet Secretary" (Saskatchewan) or similar.

== Other senior leadership ==
Associate deputy ministers are deputy ministers in waiting, often assigned to a specific project or initiative pending appointment to lead a department. Assistant deputy ministers are operational positions, usually carrying responsibility for particular functions or budgets within a department.
