= 1991 Canadian federal worker strike =

1991 federal public sector strike in Canada

- Date: 9 September 1991 – 18 September 1991
- Location: Canada
- Goals: Rescinding of an announced wage freeze for federal public sector workers.
- Methods: Strike action, protest
- Result: Government of Canada victory; Back to work legislation enacted; Wage freeze for federal public sector workers in 1991.

Parties
Canadian federal public sector workers Public Service Alliance of Canada	Government of Canada

Lead figures
	Brian Mulroney; Michael Wilson; Gilles Loiselle

The 1991 Public Service Alliance of Canada strike was a strike by federal public sector workers in Canada, represented by the Public Service Alliance of Canada.

== Background ==
Many federal public sector workers in Canada are represented by the Public Service Alliance of Canada (PSAC) trade union, the largest federal public sector union.

In the 1984 Canadian federal election, the Progressive Conservative Party of Canada led by Brian Mulroney won a majority in the federal House of Commons, and would be re-elected with a second majority in 1988. Mulroney's government would institute a range of significant economic reforms, including major free trade agreements and privatisation of many Crown corporations. It would also introduce a number of federal public sector reforms aimed at reducing red tape and public sector costs, including the Public Service 2000 initiative. The early 1990s also saw a significant economic recession across many Western countries, including Canada. By 1991, the unemployment rate in Canada was over 10%.

== History ==
=== Prelude ===
In February 1991, federal Minister of Finance Michael Wilson announced that the government would be implementing a wage freeze for all federal public sector workers in an attempt to save $685 million in the federal budget. The announcement provoked significant discontent among public sector workers, and the PSAC vowed to fight the wage freeze, including through strike action.

=== Strike ===
At midnight, on 9 September 1991, 110 000 federal public sector workers walked off the job, launching the strike. 45 000 federal public sector workers who were members of PSAC had been blocked from joining, being designated essential workers by the government. The workers in St. John's, Newfoundland and Labrador, the first time zone to go on strike, marked the beginning of the strike by throwing an effigy of Brian Mulroney into the Atlantic Ocean. President of the Treasury Board Gilles Loiselle said that the government would not negotiate over the wage freeze, and would implement back-to-work legislation to make the strike illegal if the strike persisted.

The strike had a significant impact on the Canadian economy and on federal government services. Toronto Pearson International Airport was reduced to one third of its usual capacity, while tax collectors and Rideau Canal lockmasters ended work entirely. Federal grain inspectors picketed ports, with a number of non-PSAC longshoremen refusing to cross the picket line. The Canadian automobile industry was also significantly impacted, as customs officials delayed processing of part imports from the United States, despite having been deemed essential workers by the government and forbidden to strike.

=== Back to work legislation ===
On 17 September, Mulroney introduced legislation to the House of Commons that would make the strike illegal and force the workers to return to work. The legislation would issue fines of $1000 each day to workers who continued to strike, and also mandated a wage freeze in 1991 and restricted any pay raises in 1992 to a maximum of 3%. In the face of the legislation and government promises to resume negotiations, the PSAC announced that it would end the strike.

Although the end of the strike was widely observed, a few hundred federal public sector workers would continue to form small picket lines protesting against the back to work legislation through the first week of October.

The PSAC strike fund was largely depleted by the strike, which saw the union pay $16 million over its course. In the aftermath of the strike, the PSAC raised annual dues by $60.

== Reactions ==
Prime Minister Brian Mulroney argued that the unions wanted "big government spending and uncontrolled debt," saying that the government was "here to defend the interests of the country."

According to Joanne Laucius of the Ottawa Citizen, the end of the strike left federal public sector workers "having gained little and feeling bitter towards both the Public Service Alliance of Canada and the government."

== Aftermath ==
The next sector-wide federal strike would occur in 2004. Another significant federal public sector strike would occur in 2023, the 2023 Canadian federal worker strike.
