= Nicholas Marcus Thompson =

Trinidadian-Canadian Human Rights Advocate

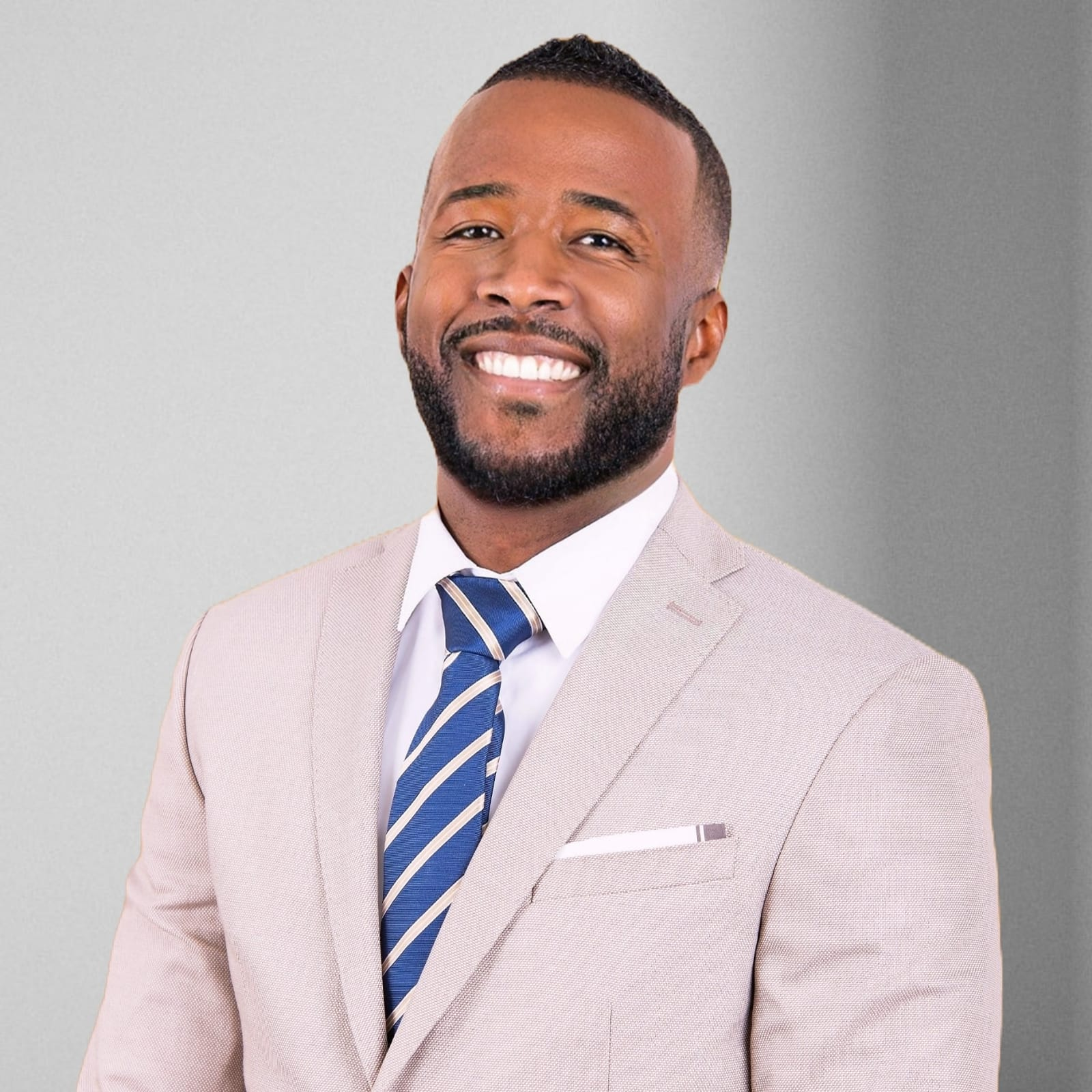

Black Class Action Secretariat

President and CEO
- Incumbent
- Assumed office January 4, 2024

Co-Chair

National Employment Equity Council

Personal details
- Born: 16 July 1986 (age 40) Piparo, Trinidad and Tobago
- Occupation: Human Rights Advocate, Executive Leader, Trade Unionist
- Awards: Martin Luther King Jr Award, Bob Marley Humanitarian Award, Bromley Lloyd Armstrong Award, Nation Builder Award, Impact Award,
- Website: nicholasmarcusthompson.com

Nicholas Marcus Thompson (born 16 July 1986) is a Trinidadian-Canadian human rights advocate, executive leader, and systemic reformer. He is the President and Chief Executive Officer of the Black Class Action Secretariat (BCAS), a litigation and advocacy organization addressing systemic discrimination in employment, and serves as Co-Chair of the National Employment Equity Council (NEC).

Thompson previously held leadership positions within the Public Service Alliance of Canada, including serving as president of the Union of Taxation Employees Toronto North. He is the founder of the Coalition Against Workplace Discrimination (CAWD), which brings together labour unions and civil society groups to challenge inequities in the workplace, and of the Global Litigation and Advocacy Network for People of African Descent (GLANPAD), an international coalition of delegates from 25 countries working to combat systemic oppression through strategic litigation and advocacy. He has served as a guest lecturer at the Lincoln Alexander School of Law, where he teaches on systemic discrimination and equity.

In 2020, Thompson organized federal employees and initiated the proposed $2.5 billion Black Class Action lawsuit against the Government of Canada, challenging systemic discrimination across 99 departments, representing approximately 45,000 workers. The Government of Canada has described the case as the "broadest, largest and most high-profile" employment-related discrimination class action. The case is currently before the Federal Court of Appeal. Thompson has contributed to legislative and policy reforms in Canada, advocated internationally at the United Nations, and convened global leaders to address systemic racism.

== Early life ==
Thompson was born in Port of Spain, and grew up in the village of Piparo in Trinidad. When he was eight, his mother moved to Morvant, and Thompson was raised by his great-grandfather, a World War II veteran and former police inspector. In his own words, Thompson "landed in Toronto as a teenager, ready to take on the world".

He is said to have attended Lester B. Pearson Collegiate Institute and later the University of Toronto.

Thompson joined Canada's public service as an employee of the Canada Revenue Agency, where he became a member of Union of Taxation Employees, a component of the Public Service Alliance of Canada. Thompson was then elected President of Union of Taxation Employees, Toronto North. He received a scholarship from the Union of Taxation Employees and graduated from the Labour College of Canada.

Thompson was soon after elected as Chairperson of Racially Visible Committee (RVC) and Vice-President of the Greater Toronto Area Council of the Public Service Alliance of Canada. In January 2021, Thompson was elected second Alternate Regional Executive Vice President of the Public Service Alliance of Canada, Ontario Region. Thompson served in these four elected positions simultaneously.

== Politics ==
On May 23, 2019, Thompson was officially nominated as a candidate for the New Democratic Party in the district of Don Valley East in the 2019 Canadian federal election. He received 4,647 votes placing third in a six-way race.

== Activism ==
Thompson challenged the Public Service Alliance of Canada, the largest federal sector union on anti-Black racism. He led Black Lives Matter protests in Toronto calling out Premier Doug Ford for not accepting that systemic racism exists in Canada. Thompson said he needed to see more than kneeling gestures from such officials as former Toronto police Chief Mark Saunders and Prime Minister Justin Trudeau.

He is the host of Union Matters, an online show which focuses on anti-racism and discrimination issues in the labour movement. The show caused national controversy in September 2020 when Thompson called out a high-profile union executive for anti-Black discrimination, resulting in their resignation.

In his native country, Trinidad and Tobago, he petitioned the government in 2014 over a major corruption scandal called LifeSport. His petition called on the then Prime Minister Kamla Persad-Bissessar and President Anthony Carmona to end their silence and to fire the cabinet minister responsible for the program. Seven days into petitioning, the Minister tendered his resignation. Media outlets attributed the resignation in part to Thompson's petition.

== Organizations and Initiatives ==
Thompson has been involved in the establishment and development of several organizations and coalitions focused on advancing human rights and addressing systemic discrimination in Canada and internationally.

=== Coalition Against Workplace Discrimination ===
Thompson established the Coalition Against Workplace Discrimination (CAWD) in 2024, a coalition of labour unions, human rights organizations, and community groups addressing systemic discrimination in employment in Canada.

In 2024, CAWD filed a complaint with the Global Alliance of National Human Rights Institutions regarding systemic discrimination within the Canadian Human Rights Commission. The complaint led to a special review of the Commission’s accreditation, described by The Hill Times as an “unprecedented” development.

The coalition also released an internal report obtained through the Access to Information Act documenting workplace discrimination at the Privy Council Office, the central agency that supports the Prime Minister and serves as the secretariat to Cabinet and head of the federal public service. The report, authored by Rachel Zellars, documented racial discrimination, including the use of racial slurs, microaggressions, and systemic barriers to hiring and promotion affecting Black and racialized employees.

=== Global Litigation and Advocacy Network for People of African Descent ===
The Global Litigation and Advocacy Network (GLANPAD) was announced in 2024 at the United Nations Permanent Forum on People of African Descent in Geneva, Switzerland, as an initiative focused on coordinating strategic litigation and advocacy efforts addressing systemic discrimination affecting people of African descent.

The initiative was introduced in a statement delivered by Thompson, in which he announced the establishment of a global network bringing together legal professionals, activists, and community leaders to pursue coordinated legal and advocacy strategies to combat systemic issues against Black people globally.

=== National Employment Equity Council ===
The National Employment Equity Council (NEC) was established in 2026 as a national coordinating body bringing together more than 20 labour unions, human rights organizations, and community groups to advance employment equity in Canada.

The Council has focused on advocating for the implementation of the 2023 Employment Equity Act Review Task Force recommendations, which propose reforms to address systemic discrimination, including the recognition of additional designated groups and strengthened enforcement mechanisms.

Thompson serves as an inaugural Co-Chair of the Council and is described as having played a convening role in its establishment.

== Appointments ==
On November 14, 2025 the Toronto City Council appointed Thompson to the Confronting Anti-Black Racism Advisory Committee. The Committee provides advice to City Council and serves as a convening table to advise on inter-government and institutional work on anti-Black racism in sectors such as education, child-welfare, policing and the justice system, housing, and employment.

== International Advocacy ==
Thompson has been a prominent figure in advocating for the rights of Black Canadians on the international stage, focusing on discrimination issues within Canada's federal public service.

=== UN Human Rights Council Complaint ===
On September 25, 2022, Thompson announced at the Parliament building in Ottawa a significant development alongside figures like New Democratic Party Leader Jagmeet Singh, Secretary General of Amnesty International Canada Ketty Nivyabandi, PIPSC Vice President Norma Domey, and MP Matthew Green. The Black Class Action Secretariat (BCAS) had lodged a complaint with the United Nations Human Rights Council's Special Rapporteur for racism, addressing systemic racism in hiring and promotions within Canada's federal public service. This action was a major step in elevating the issue to an international platform.

=== Addresses at the United Nations ===
Thompson continued his international advocacy with several key addresses at the United Nations:

- December 4, 2022: Address at the United Nations Permanent Forum for People of African Descent in Geneva, Switzerland, highlighting discrimination in hiring and promotions faced by Canadian federal public sector workers of African descent.
- May 30, 2023: Speech in New York at the UN, focusing on challenges experienced by Black Canadians in the federal public service, referencing findings about the Canadian Human Rights Commission's discrimination against its Black employees.
- November 10, 2023: Participation in the United Nations' universal periodic review of Canada in Geneva, Switzerland. Thompson criticized Canada's human rights record, highlighting systemic discrimination against Black workers and calling for accountability and review of the Canadian Human Rights Commission's practices.
- April 16, 2024: Addressed the United Nationals Permanent Forum on People of African Descent in Genera, Switzerland. Thompson announced the establishment of the Global Litigation and Advocacy Network for People of African Descent.

Canadian Human Rights Commission "Special Review"

On February 29, 2024, the Global Alliance of National Human Rights Institutions (GANHRI) received a formal complaint submitted by the Black Class Action Secretariat (BCAS), led by Nicholas Marcus Thompson, on behalf of a coalition of Canadian civil society organizations. The complaint alleged that the Canadian Human Rights Commission (CHRC) engaged in discriminatory practices against Black and racialized employees. It referenced findings by the Senate of Canada's Human Rights Committee and the Treasury Board of Canada Secretariat, both of which identified systemic racial discrimination within the CHRC.

In its 2024 quarterly report, the Subcommittee on Accreditation (SCA) of GANHRI noted:

"The SCA is of the view that third-party submissions and publicly available information raise concerns about the continued compliance of the CHRC with the Paris Principles, including its ability to conduct its mandate in an efficient manner and its perceived credibility in tackling systemic human rights violations."

Consequently, the SCA initiated a Special Review under Article 16.2 of the GANHRI Statute to assess the CHRC's ongoing compliance with the Paris Principles.

This marks the first time the CHRC has been subjected to a Special Review since its accreditation as Canada's national human rights institution.

== Black Class Action ==
Thompson tried to address anti-Black discrimination at the Canada Revenue Agency, the country's tax authority. He made representation on behalf of Black workers to the Commissioner of the Canada Revenue Agency, the Minister of National Revenue, the Clerk of the Privy Council and the Prime Minister Justin Trudeau, to no avail.

He then mobilized Black workers from across the country, including workers from the Canadian Human Rights Commission, the Royal Canadian Mounted Police, the Department of National Defense and Public Prosecutions Canada to file a class action lawsuit.

On December 2, 2020, the landmark case Nicholas Marcus Thompson et al V. Her Majesty was filed, naming the entire federal public service as defendants. Thompson said that Canada's public service must reflect the people that it serves.

The proposed class-action lawsuit was filed on behalf of Black federal public service employees who faced systemic discrimination related to hiring and promotions since 1970. That was the year that Canada ratified the United Nations International Convention on the Elimination of All Forms of Racial Discrimination.

Around 30,000 Black civil servants have allegedly been deprived of opportunities and benefits afforded to others based on their race since the 1970s.

The claim states that the Employment Equity Act sought to prevent discrimination but in reality, there has allegedly been a de facto practice of Black employee exclusion throughout the public service because of the permeation of systemic discrimination through Canada's institutional structure..

== Awards ==
In January 2020, Thompson was awarded the Activist of the Year by the Public Service Alliance of Canada's Greater Toronto Area Council.

On February 6, 2021, John Tory, the Mayor of Toronto, proclaimed Bob Marley Day for the 30th year. Thompson was named a recipient of the Bob Marley Day award for his contribution to the advancement and development of his community.

In June 2023, the Toronto & York Regional Labour Council awarded Thompson with the Bromley Lloyd Armstrong award in recognition of his tireless work in the areas of equity, inclusion, and human rights. Armstrong was a Canadian civil rights leader that helped pave the way for Canada's first Human Rights laws.

In October 2024, Thompson received two awards. The Caribbean Camera newspaper presented Thompson with an Impact Award for activism, underscoring his "global impact". The Canada Leadership Summit presented Thompson with a National Builder Social Justice Award

On January 18, 2025, Thompson received the Martin Luther King Jr. Community Leadership Award presented by MLK Connexus.

On February 9, 2025, the Jamaican Canadian Association awarded Thompson with a community service award "in recognition of their outstanding dedication and invaluable contribution to Canada and the Black community".

In February 2026, The Hill Times listed Thompson among Black Canadian "trailblazers" highlighted during Black History Month.

== Electoral record ==
2019 Canadian federal election: Don Valley East
Party	Candidate	Votes	%	±%	Expenditures
Liberal	Yasmin Ratansi	25,295	59.81	+1.98	$74,656.45
Conservative	Michael Ma	10,115	23.92	-5.31	$66,318.23
New Democratic	Nicholas Thompson	4,647	10.99	+0.63	none listed
Green	Dan Turcotte	1,675	3.96	+1.37	$3,743.20
People's	John P. Hendry	562	1.33	-	none listed
Total valid votes/expense limit		42,294	99.98		
Total rejected ballots		438	1.02	+0.41	
Turnout		42,732	64.23	-1.31	
Eligible voters		66,530			
Liberal hold		Swing		+3.65	
Source: Elections Canada
