= Impact of the COVID-19 pandemic on the meat industry in Canada =

Impact of COVID-19

During the COVID-19 pandemic in Canada, outbreaks of the virus took place in factories operated by the meat packing industry and the poultry processing industry. These outbreaks affected multiple plants, leading to closures of some factories and disruption of others, and posing a threat to the food supply in Canada.

The Cargill beef processing plant in High River, Alberta is the largest workplace outbreak in Canada, and having over 1000 cases linked to the site, it is considered the single largest infection cause in North America.

== Early response ==
Sometime in late March 2020 several industry groups, among them the Canadian Meat Council which included as regular members Cargill, JBS Foods International and the Alberta Ministry of Agriculture and Forestry, distributed a flyer entitled "Safeguarding the Canadian Meat Supply". The flyer, which stressed the industry's adherence to CFIA regulations, detailed measures which would be taken to do just that:

- Symptom monitoring - 4 points
- Temperature monitoring - 2 points
- Travel and exposure history - 2 points
- Controlled entry - 3 points
- Hand sanitation - 2 points
- Personnel distancing - 3 points
- Facility and equipment sanitation - 4 points

It was produced in eight languages. It was distributed, along with a cover letter signed by seven association leaders, to meat professionals in Canada, Mexico, China, Hong Kong, Macau, Philippines, Singapore, Vietnam, Indonesia, South Korea, and Japan.

Sometime in early April, a two-page fact sheet entitled "Food Safety and COVID-19" detailed the measures consumers should take to protect themselves and their families. It was keyed in red and made liberal use of federal government advice, and directed readers to government help lines. The industry organizations also produced a pair of videos.

== Overall impact ==
Seventy percent of Canada's beef processing facilities are concentrated in two meat processing facilities in Alberta, both of which closed due to the COVID-19 pandemic on April 20. Coupled with the drop in oil prices, Alberta's financial situation was significantly affected. Experts noted as early as 8 April that the Alberta economy needs to diversify, and perhaps the government needs introduce a Provincial Sales Tax.

As of April 23, the province of Alberta had launched an occupational health and safety investigation into conditions at the Cargill meat-packing plant in High River. 96 employees at a JBS plant in Brooks had tested positive for COVID-19.

Hog producers were unhappy due to closed slaughterhouses and closed restaurants, and lost money on every animal they sold. Human cases of COVID-19 disease in April "at American pork-processing plants, including in South Dakota and Iowa, have temporarily closed facilities and slashed the number of hogs being processed every day by an estimated 60,000." Manitoba hog producers were particularly unhappy because they used to market to the Americans. A finishing pig (finisher) that commanded $180 in January 2020 is now worth around $130. The producers want reinstated the federal government subsidy called the "set-aside program, which compensates producers for feeding the animals they hold back (from the slaughterhouses) a maintenance diet. The program was first implemented during the BSE crisis" of 25 years before.

On April 28, McDonald's Canada announced that it would begin using beef from approved sources outside of Canada, to supplement their Canadian supply. The National Post reported that product would come from the Australia, Ireland, New Zealand, the United Kingdom, United States, and Uruguay. It removed Angus beef burgers from its menu, temporarily.

One supermarket in Alberta noted that they were getting less supply of beef, but not a significant impact as of late April.

Some pigs in eastern Canada were euthanised, as slaughterhouses closed.

UFCW Local 401, which represents various beef production plants in Alberta, called for a stop work order in early May.

On 11 May, the CFIA's Agriculture Union of embedded inspectors at slaughterhouses said that management is "threatening disciplinary action against employees who refuse to be reassigned to work at COVID-19-infected meat plants", while Deputy PM Chrystia Freeland said that "those who feel unsafe won't be forced back to work."

On 11 May, a CBC journalist wrote that "The Cargill plant in Alberta, where there have been about 1,000 reported cases [of human COVID-19], is now considered the largest single-site outbreak in North America."

On 13 May, it was reported that forty government food inspectors had contracted COVID-19, 21 of them in Alberta.

== Specific processors ==
=== Cargill ===
==== High River plant ====
The town of High River had 164 cases and one death as of April 17, with some of the patients being employees of the Cargill meat packing plant. The plant continued at a reduced capacity, but no layoffs had occurred as of April 17. As of April 17, there were 358 cases linked to the plant, accounting for 15% of the province's cases; that ratio grew to 1 in 4 by late April. United Food and Commercial Workers Canada Union Local 401 lobbied unsuccessfully for the plant's closure since the point at which health authorities were aware of 38 cases linked to the facility. On April 20, Cargill temporarily closed the facility after a total of 484 cases were confirmed.

Fifteen residents of Eden Valley 216 and Morley were found to have COVID-19 in late April; both are Stoney Nakoda Nation communities. Contract tracing connected some of those cases to Cargill, where some members of that community work.

On 11 May, the Government of Alberta disclosed that a second worker from the Cargill plant had died that day.

As of mid-May, 18 on-site food inspectors at the plant had contracted COVID-19.

==== Chambly, Quebec plant ====
At Chambly, Quebec's Cargill plant, 64 employees were contracted the disease. The plant will close by May 13 as a preventative measure, once all food is processed.

=== Conestoga Meats ===
Conestoga Meats, in Canada, suffered 2 covid outbreaks with a confirmed 88 positive covid cases. According to the executive director of Workers Action Centre, the conditions of employment and the poor quality of the jobs at Conestoga Meats "led to a high rate of infection". 33 out of the 88 positive cases were recorded to be community acquired. No deaths were declared.

=== JBS Canada ===
In Brooks, Alberta, 7% of the population tested positive for COVID-19, with 600 workers confirmed and probable cases in the JBS Foods plant. As of May 9, 510 workers had recovered, but one worker died. The plant added a shift premium of $4 an hour, but many employees skipped their shifts, forcing the company to reduce their schedule to one shift. As of April 21, the company claimed that there had been no walk-offs.

=== Lilydale ===
On May 1, it was announced that 52 employees of a Lilydale poultry plant in Coquitlam were infected by the virus.

As of April 23, at least one employee of the Lilydale plant in southeast Calgary had COVID-19.

=== Maple Leaf Foods ===
According to a message posted on the companies website, at least 59 employees contracted COVID-19. The company reported one COVID related death. Since the pandemic began, Maple Leaf Foods deployed a plan to tackle COVID-19, the company said: "We deployed our pandemic plan early, conducting daily health and temperature screening, requiring masks and social distancing, installing plexiglass separators between workstations where possible, and adding trailers at some locations to decrease density in employee welfare areas." The company encouraged all employees to get the COVID-19 vaccination.

=== Olymel ===
The Olymel facility in Red Deer faced an extensive COVID-19 outbreak. 515 positive COVID cases were recorded and at least 3 deaths were announced.

=== United Poultry Co. ===
28 employees tested positive for the virus at the United Poultry Company, after the health authority investigated. It is not clear whether the virus was spread through contact during work, or within a break room. There was evidence at the plant that employees did have access to gloves and some plastic face coverings, but they identified that the plans that were in place were inadequate or were not appropriately executed.
