= Agricultural Union =

Agricultural Union may refer to:

- African Agricultural Union
- Agricultural Union (Israel)
- Agriculture Union, Canada
- Cartaginese Agricultural Union
- Namibia Agricultural Union
- Rhodesian Agricultural Union
- Transvaal Agricultural Union

== See also ==
- Syndicat agricole
