= Chris Aylward =

Canadian trade union leader

Christopher Dale Joseph Aylward is a Canadian trade union leader. From St. John's, Newfoundland, Aylward was national president of the Public Service Alliance of Canada (PSAC) from 2018 to 2024. Prior to being elected president, He served as PSAC's national executive vice-president from 2012 to 2018. He began his career in the labour movement as a shop steward with PSAC affiliate Union of Taxation Employees while working at the St. John's Taxation Centre. He led PSAC during the 2023 Canadian federal worker strike, a two weeklong national work stoppage.
