= Nycole Turmel =

Canadian politician and labour leader (born 1942)

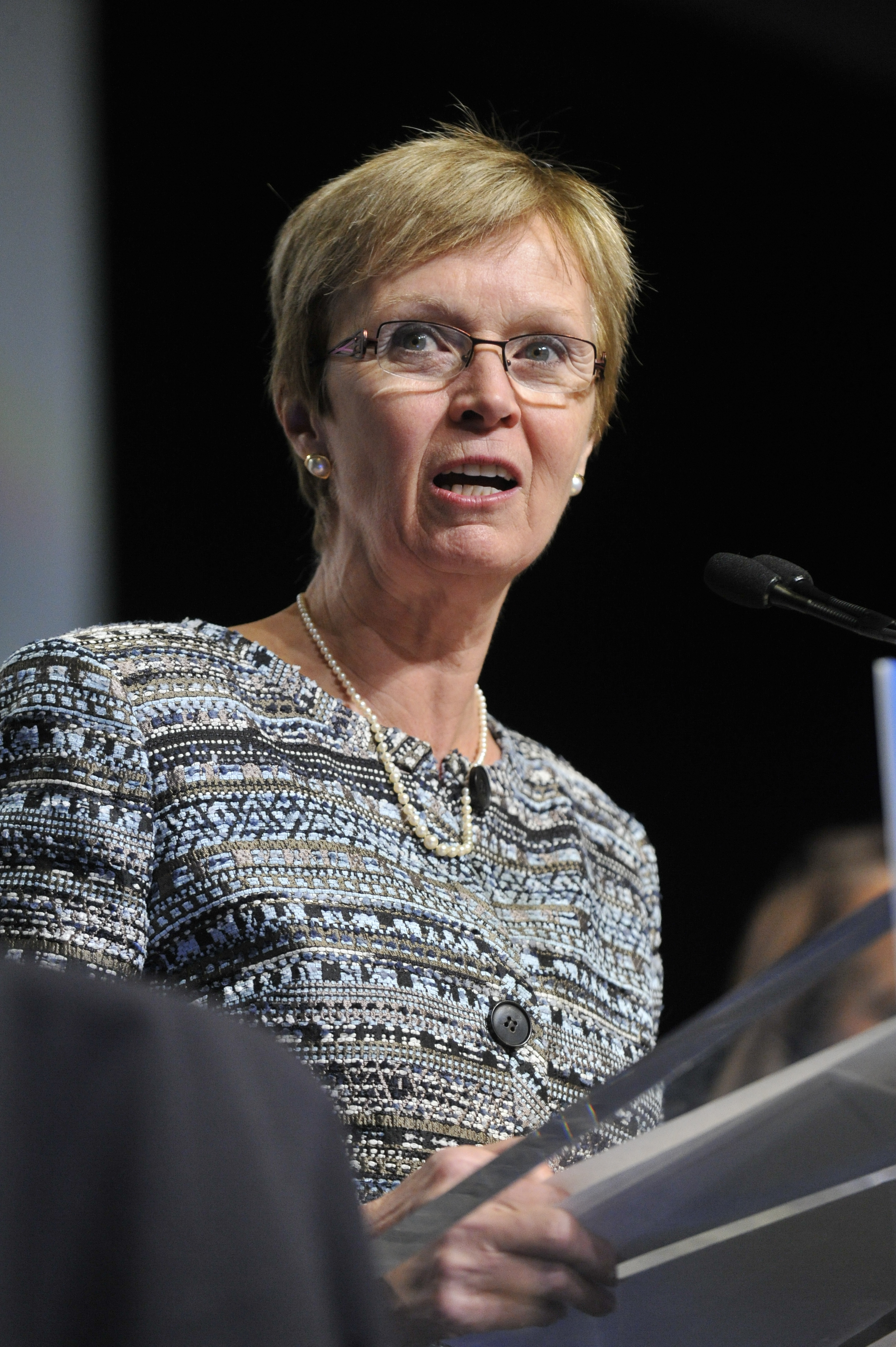
- Turmel in 2011

Leader of the Opposition
- In office August 22, 2011 – March 24, 2012
- Preceded by: Jack Layton
- Succeeded by: Tom Mulcair

Interim leader of the New Democratic Party
- In office August 22, 2011 – March 24, 2012
- Deputy: Tom Mulcair; Libby Davies
- Preceded by: Jack Layton
- Succeeded by: Tom Mulcair
- Acting; July 28, 2011 – August 22, 2011
- Leader: Jack Layton (Note: Layton was on leave from July 28 until his death on August 22, 2011.)
- Preceded by: Jack Layton
- Succeeded by: Herself (as interim leader)

Chief Opposition Whip
- In office April 19, 2012 – October 22, 2015
- Leader: Tom Mulcair
- Preceded by: Chris Charlton
- Succeeded by: Dave MacKenzie

Whip of the New Democratic Party
- In office April 19, 2012 – October 22, 2015
- Leader: Tom Mulcair
- Preceded by: Chris Charlton
- Succeeded by: Marjolaine Boutin-Sweet

Member of Parliament for Hull—Aylmer
- In office May 2, 2011 – October 19, 2015
- Preceded by: Marcel Proulx
- Succeeded by: Greg Fergus

National President of the Public Service Alliance of Canada
- In office May 5, 2000 – May 6, 2006
- Preceded by: Daryl Bean
- Succeeded by: John Gordon

Personal details
- Born: September 1, 1942 (age 84) Sainte-Marie, Quebec, Canada
- Party: New Democratic (1991–present)
- Other political affiliations: Bloc Québécois (2006–2011); Québec solidaire

Nycole Turmel (born September 1, 1942) is a Canadian politician who served as the member of Parliament (MP) for Hull—Aylmer from 2011 to 2015. A member of the New Democratic Party (NDP), Turmel served as the party's interim leader from 2011 to 2012.

Turmel was first elected to the House of Commons of Canada in the 2011 federal election, representing the electoral district of Hull—Aylmer, and became interim leader of the New Democratic Party after leader Jack Layton took a leave of absence in the summer of 2011 for health reasons. When Layton subsequently died from complications due to cancer on August 22, 2011, Turmel became Leader of the Official Opposition, the second woman to be so appointed. She held both positions until the selection of Thomas Mulcair in the 2012 leadership election on March 24, 2012. She was defeated in her riding by Liberal Greg Fergus in the 2015 federal election.

Turmel is a long-time trade unionist and served as president of the Public Service Alliance of Canada from 2000 to 2006.

== Personal life ==
Nycole Turmel was born to Laval Turmel and Emilia Jacques in Ste-Marie-de-Beauce, Quebec, a nearly completely francophone area of Quebec, where she lived until the age of 18. Her father ran a dairy in the region, Laiterie Turmel, which produced and delivered milk, cream and ice cream. The family has a history of political involvement; her father served as a city councillor, as did one of her brothers. At 18, and newly married, she and her husband left her home region of the Beauce to move to Alma, Quebec, for work. She subsequently had three children and, after separating from her husband, raised them as a single mother. In 1990, Turmel left Alma and moved to Gatineau in order to take up a new job with her union. She has resided in Gatineau since.

Turmel is bilingual, speaking English as a second language, and is now married to a British-born Anglophone. She has three children and nine grandchildren, as well as a brother who lives in Sainte-Marie. Turmel has an abiding interest in outdoor sports, especially cross-country skiing, tennis, and cycling.

== Career before politics ==
In 1977, after she had moved to Alma, Quebec, Turmel began working as an employment counsellor assistant at the federal government's regional Canada Employment Centre. Turmel credits this experience as inspiring her to become active with her union, saying "I got involved in the union because of the injustices I was seeing." In particular, she says the clerical and regulatory (CR) employees, most of whom were women, were not being treated fairly. For example, the CR employees received less overtime reimbursement for meals than did other, male-dominated, employee groups.

=== PSAC career ===
It was in 1979 that Turmel was first elected to a position in her union, the Canadian Employment and Immigration Union (CEIU), a component of the Public Service Alliance of Canada (PSAC), becoming vice-president of the local. She says that at the time the union was male-dominated and "it wasn't easy for women to participate in the union", noting that she relied on the mentorship of other female members. Over time, Turmel held progressively more senior elected positions at the local and regional level of her union, eventually serving as vice president of the CEIU in the late 1980s.

==== 1980 CEIU Clerical and Regulatory strike ====
In 1980, during a difficult round of collective bargaining, the 40,000 Clerical and Regulatory CEIU members went on what Our Times magazine described as the first big strike in the federal government—a strike that did not have the sanction of the union's national executive. Turmel tells the story as follows:

Women workers were being told by our union not to take strike action against an unfair employer. The male-dominated leadership at the time was out of touch with the reality faced by CRs in our workplaces. We were outraged by the way the union was treating us, but we were even more outraged at the employer. We took them both on, and we became leaders overnight. To drive our message home, we sent funeral wreaths and cactuses to the union's leadership. But we did a lot more than that in the workplace: we organized and we had fun! We would dress up in all sorts of costumes to greet our clients, and, at key moments, we would all toot our whistles, which would cause quite a storm.

At the time, Turmel was a single parent with three children: two teenagers and a nine-year-old. She says the strike was a huge challenge because of that. The workers were predominantly female, with many struggling to support families. The union leadership eventually accepted the strike, which lasted for 15 days and ended with the workers winning wage increases, bonus payments, and improved parental and family care leave.

==== CEIU roles ====
After that strike, Turmel became further involved in her union and was elected president of her local in 1981. She later moved on to the district level and then to the regional level of the CEIU. One of Turmel's first political fights was around the closure of a military base at Mount Apica in 1989. She first campaigned to try and save the base and, when it became evident that that was impossible, she lobbied to ensure that displaced employees got a job somewhere else without losing their benefits. Turmel observed that such layoffs had a significant effect on the affected workers because of economic conditions in the region: "It had a big impact economically for the Saguenay–Lac-Saint-Jean region. Many of the workers were from that region. It was not like today where it is common to transfer because of a job or if your spouse gets work in another city. It was not easy to find another job in the region."

In 1990, she made the decision to run for a national elected position; as part of a pioneering wave of women within the union who were assuming leadership roles, she campaigned for the presidency of the CEIU arguing that "it's time a woman ran the component, and I am ready." While her campaign for the presidency was unsuccessful, she became the alternate to the national president of the CEIU and moved to Gatineau. "I was not fully bilingual, my network was in Quebec and even though my children were grown up it was still difficult," Turmel explained.

==== PSAC executive roles ====
A year later she was elected onto the PSAC executive: Turmel became Fourth Executive Vice-president of the PSAC in 1991, serving until 1994, when she became First Executive Vice-president. In that role, which she continued in until 1997, Turmel was responsible for women's equality issues within the union.

Pay equity was a major issue in the PSAC. In 1984, the first human rights complaint against the federal government was filed. "I worked a lot on our pay equity struggle," said Turmel, "I was on the executive when we decided not to accept the government’s offer to settle and to wait for the court decisions. Many members were really upset at us. Years later we won the big fight and a lot of money for federal employees. This came with a recognition—long overdue—of the value of their work."

Equity issues were a passion for Turmel. She pushed for change with the employer and also within the union. "In concert with a group of women members and staff at the 1996 national women’s conference, we decided to change the way we were conducting the conference," she recalled, "We wanted it more inclusive and with a vision, a plan of action including being more involved in political action and politics. There was a lot of backlash and I came close to being defeated at the PSAC convention in 1997 over this. But it was the right decision."

In 1997, she became PSAC National Executive Vice-president. She stayed in that role until 2000, while serving briefly as acting national president in late 1999. It was during that time that Turmel suggested that a Member of Parliament “deserved to be roughed up because he did not respect the picket line,” a comment that has been featured on Conservative attack web sites.

==== PSAC president ====
Turmel was elected president of the PSAC on May 5, 2000, becoming the first woman to ever assume this role in the 34-year history of the PSAC. In 2003, she was re-elected for a second three-year term, which concluded in 2006. According to the Ottawa Citizen, her term as PSAC President was marked by a major shift toward social activism for the union. The newspaper writes that Turmel climbed to the highest ranks of PSAC by championing the cause of pay equity and that she was a key player in the union's $3.6-billion pay equity settlement, which gave her an important power base among women in the public service. She served as a member of the executive committee of the Canadian Labour Congress. Under her leadership PSAC created the National Aboriginal, Inuit and Metis Network. In 2003 PSAC created the Social Justice Fund to advance work in five priority areas including anti-poverty initiatives in Canada and humanitarian relief in Canada and around the world. A Conservative attack web site described the fund thusly: "As a union head she demanded that taxpayers pay for a special fund to pay a campaign 'to fight globalization.'"

On September 11, 2001, PSAC members were on strike. Moments after the second plane flew into the World Trade Center in New York, Turmel, on behalf of PSAC members, suspended their legal strike action, with PSAC members returning to work providing services to Canadians and thousands of airline passengers from around the world. Days later, she pleaded for racial tolerance in a world that was quickly losing perspective and has said that racism then gained a stronger foothold in what were before considered to be tolerant and progressive communities. Weeks later, she with others challenged the loss of freedom articulated in the Canadian government's anti-terrorist legislation.

==== United Way ====
From 1992 onwards, Turmel acted as one of the PSAC leaders helping to coordinate and officially lend the union's support to the United Way's Government of Canada Workplace Charitable Campaign. She was ultimately awarded the Mitchell Sharp Award for Meritorious Service in recognition of her contribution to the campaign (see "Accolades", below).

=== Post-retirement career ===
After retiring from the PSAC, Turmel served as vice president of the Ombudsman's office of the City of Gatineau from 2007 to 2011, and she sat on the boards of two affordable housing agencies in the Outaouais. She also became treasurer of the Canadian Research Institute for the Advancement of Women in October 2010 and she represented workers on the Management Committee of Financial Assets of the QFL Solidarity Fund. She was active on the United Way Retiree Committee.

== Political career ==
=== Municipal politics ===
In November 2009, Turmel ran in the Gatineau municipal election in the district of Plateau-Manoir-des-Trembles; she lost to opponent Maxime Tremblay by 96 votes out of 4,261.

=== Political affiliations ===
Turmel has been a member of the NDP since 1991. In the 1990s, she served as Associate President (Labour) of the party under leader Alexa McDonough, and she co-chaired, with Dick Proctor, the Social Democratic Forum on Canada's Future, a panel of "nine distinguished Canadians" which held broad cross-country consultations between March 1998 and January 1999 "to create a vision for the future of the federation" and canvass Canadians' ideas about progressive government. She also moderated the leadership process that saw Jack Layton elected as NDP leader in 2003.

As the president of PSAC, Turmel encouraged members of the union to vote for candidates—Liberal, NDP, and Bloc Québécois—that the union had endorsed for their progressive values and for being considered electable in their riding. In December 2006, Turmel took out a membership in the Bloc Québécois in support of her friend, Carole Lavallée, who was running for the party. Turmel says that she was a Bloc member in her friend's riding and that she refused to transfer her membership to her own riding when asked. This put Turmel in violation of the NDP constitution which prohibits being a member of more than one federal political party at the same time. Turmel allowed her NDP membership to lapse in 2009, something she says was unintentional and attributes to a credit card expiry date issue; she became a paid-up member again in October 2010. During her time as a Bloc member, she gave four donations to the party, totaling $235. In January 2011, Turmel cancelled her membership in the Bloc Québécois and later filed papers to run as a New Democrat candidate. Turmel, however, was never a separatist: she says that she voted “no” in both the 1980 and 1995 sovereignty referendums, and has never voted for the Bloc. She also refused a request from former Bloc leader Gilles Duceppe to run as a Bloc candidate because of her disagreement with the party on the issue of Quebec sovereignty.

Provincially, Turmel was a member of Québec solidaire. She says that she joined the party because of a friendship with one of its leaders, Françoise David, and that she renewed her membership card every year. After becoming NDP interim leader, Turmel said she would abandon her membership with Quebec Solidaire.

=== 2011 federal election ===
The 2011 federal election was Turmel's first time running for the NDP. On February 3, 2011, NDP leader Jack Layton announced her candidacy in Hull—Aylmer. Her campaign focused on local issues including getting legislative protection for Gatineau Park, a possible ferry between Aylmer and Kanata, and expanding the Rapibus transit project. She picked up key endorsements during the campaign, including from the Ottawa Citizen newspaper. Turmel went on to defeat longstanding Liberal incumbent Marcel Proulx by a shocking 23,000-vote margin. She is the first non-Liberal to win the riding in an election since its creation in 1914. The only other time it has been out of Liberal hands was from 1990 to 1993, when Gilles Rocheleau joined seven other MPs in forming the Bloc Québécois caucus; Rocheleau was heavily defeated in the 1993 election.

After the election, Turmel was named Chair of the NDP's National Caucus, with the unanimous support of her colleagues in the NDP caucus, and appointed critic for Public Works and Government Services Canada. She began sitting on the Standing Committee on Government Operations and Estimates on June 2, 2011.

=== Interim NDP leader ===
On July 25, 2011, NDP leader Jack Layton announced at a news conference that he was taking a temporary leave of absence for health reasons and recommended that Turmel be appointed interim leader for the duration of his absence. The recommendation was unanimously supported by the NDP caucus, and she became interim leader on July 28, 2011, when the party's federal council voted to support Jack Layton's recommendation. At the time, because Parliament was in summer recess and Layton was hoping to return when Parliament resumed in September, Turmel did not formally assume the role of Leader of the Official Opposition. She only assumed that office upon Jack Layton's death on August 22, 2011, and she stands as just the second woman to have held the role, after former Canadian Alliance MP Deborah Grey, who served in 2000 during that party's leadership race. Turmel chose not to move into Stornoway, as her home and riding were in the National Capital Region, though she did use Stornoway for entertaining and did sleep over on occasion.

While serving as interim NDP leader, Turmel participated at the state funeral for Jack Layton, reading a biblical passage. Turmel yielded her position as interim NDP leader to Thomas Mulcair when he succeeded in the 2012 NDP leadership election on March 24, 2012.

=== NDP Shadow Cabinet ===
Turmel was appointed as the Opposition Whip in the New Democratic Party's first shadow cabinet. She was defeated in the 2015 general election. Turmel endorsed Alberta MP Heather McPherson in the 2026 New Democratic Party leadership election.

=== Gatineau Park Legislation ===
Following through on a promise made during the 2011 federal election, Ms. Turmel introduced a private member's bill in the House of Commons to protect Gatineau Park on November 8, 2012. If passed, her Bill C-465 would establish the park's boundaries by act of parliament, as well as clarify the National Capital Commission's responsibilities with respect to Gatineau Park.

Several environmental groups supported introduction of Ms. Turmel's bill, including the Canadian Parks and Wilderness Society, Nature Québec, and the Conseil régional de l’environnement et du développement durable de l’Outaouais (CREDDO).

Another environmental group, however, the Gatineau Park Protection Committee (GPPC), said Ms. Turmel's bill fell short of meeting basic park protection criteria. According to the GPPC, both Bill C-465 and its successor, Bill C-565, place the interests of the park's private landowners above those of the public; encourage construction of more houses in Gatineau Park; and create confusion and contradiction in the National Capital Act. As well, the GPPC has said Ms. Turmel's legislation lacks a public-consultation mechanism, disregards the issue of Quebec's territorial integrity, and fails to make conservation the first priority of park management.

== Accolades ==
In 2006, Turmel received the Mitchell Sharp Award for Meritorious Service from the Government of Canada Workplace Charitable Campaign. The award is granted to meritorious retirees who have shown and continue to show support for their community. Upon conferring the award, Jo-Anne Poirier, CEO of the Workplace Charitable Campaign, remarked, "Nycole is extremely focused on the community and showed great leadership throughout the years, making herself available at all times to lend support and advice. We attribute our successful campaigns to her strong leadership."

A Research Academic Chair at the Université du Québec à Montréal on public spaces and political innovations was named in Turmel's honour and financed by the PSAC.

== Publications ==
- Mortimer, John; Turmel, Nycole (April 24, 2006). "Are fines for crossing the picket line fair?". Canadian HR Reporter. 19 (8). Toronto, ON: Thomson Reuters Canada: 27. ISSN 0838-228X.
- Turmel, Nycole (1996). "Is the Canadian government all treaty no action?" (PDF). Canadian Woman Studies. 16 (3). Toronto, ON: Inanna Publications and Education: 44–5. ISSN 0713-3235.

== Electoral record ==
2015 Canadian federal election: Hull—Aylmer
Party	Candidate	Votes	%	±%	Expenditures
Liberal	Greg Fergus	28,478	51.37	+30.88	$77,403.19
New Democratic	Nycole Turmel	17,472	31.52	-27.26	$73,823.88
Conservative	Étienne Boulrice	4,278	7.72	-2.33	$3,208.51
Bloc Québécois	Maude Chouinard-Boucher	3,625	6.54	-2.14	$5,830.63
Green	Roger Fleury	1,035	1.87	-0.14	$6,523.33
Christian Heritage	Sean J. Mulligan	291	0.52	–	$5,299.81
Independent	Luc Desjardins	160	0.3	–	–
Marxist–Leninist	Gabriel Girard	101	0.18	–	–
Total valid votes/Expense limit		55,440	100.0		$213,352.22
Total rejected ballots		391	–	–	
Turnout		55,831	70.8%	–	
Eligible voters		78,773			
Liberal gain from New Democratic		Swing		28.92%	
Source: Elections Canada

2011 Canadian federal election
Party	Candidate	Votes	%	±%	Expenditures
New Democratic	Nycole Turmel	35,194	59.20%	+39.37%	
Liberal	Marcel Proulx	12,051	20.27%	-17.20%	
Conservative	Nancy Brassard-Fortin	6,058	10.19%	-4.94%	
Bloc Québécois	Dino Lemay	5,019	8.44%	-13.63%	
Green	Roger Fleury	1,125	1.89%	-3.37%	
Total valid votes/Expense limit		59,447	100.00%		
Total rejected ballots		355	–		
Turnout		59,802	–		

2009 Gatineau municipal election: Plateau–Manoir-des-Trembles District
Candidate	Votes	%
Maxime Tremblay	2,076	48.7%
Nycole Turmel	1,980	46.5%
Jean-Nicholas Martineau	205	4.8%
Total valid votes	4,261	100.0%

== Notes ==
Parliament of Canada
Preceded by Marcel Proulx	Member of Parliament for Hull—Aylmer; 2011–2015	Succeeded by Greg Fergus
Political offices
Preceded by Jack Layton	Leader of the Opposition; 2011–2012	Succeeded by Thomas Mulcair
Party political offices
Preceded by Jack Layton	Leader of the New Democratic Party; 2011–2012 interim	Succeeded by Thomas Mulcair
