= Canada Employment and Immigration Union =

Canadian labour union

- Founded: November 1977
- Headquarters: 275 Slater Street, Ottawa, Ontario
- Location: Canada
- Members: 30,000+
- Key people: Rubina Boucher, National President
- Affiliations: Public Service Alliance of Canada
- Website: ceiu-seic.ca

The Canada Employment and Immigration Union (CEIU) is a Canadian labour union, with over 30,000 members from across every Canadian Province and Territory. CEIU is affiliated with the Public Service Alliance of Canada (PSAC), and all CEIU members are automatically members of the PSAC. As affiliated, the PSAC is the bargaining agent for CEIU and other component unions for negotiations with the Treasury Board. CEIU members are part of the Program and Administrative Services (PA) group.

CEIUs 30,000 members work for the Federal Public Service within Service Canada / ESDC, IRCC and the Immigration and Refugee Board (IRB) as Immigration officers, Employment Insurance adjudicators, Program Services Delivery Clerks (PSDCs), Service Canada Payment and/or Benefit Officers, and others.

== Structure ==
There are over 165 locals across Canada, and each local administers its own affairs, elects its own officers, and is responsible for the day-to-day relationship with local management.

Every three years, CEIU holds its Triennial convention where delegates determine the union's policy on all matters affecting the members and their organization. The National President and the National Executive Vice-president are elected by delegates at the convention. Between conventions, the National Executive, headed by the National President and the National Executive Vice-president, is responsible for the affairs of the Union. The 15 National Vice-presidents (NVPs) represent geographic regions, departments, and other constituencies (such as IRCC, IRB, Women's issues, Human Rights) and are elected by their respective members.

== Staff ==
CEIU is the only component of the PSAC to have its own network of union offices across the country. National Union Representatives in Newfoundland and Labrador, Nova Scotia, New Brunswick, Quebec, Ontario, Manitoba, Alberta, and British Columbia work exclusively with CEIU members and their local leaders. National Union Representatives assist members with grievances and other issues, provide training, and help locals to organize and maintain a strong union presence in the workplace. Staff at the union's national office in Ottawa work at the national level on communications, member mobilization, health and safety, human rights and equity, as well as perform research, assist in consultation with senior management, and provide financial, clerical, and administrative support.

CEIU staff are represented by the Canadian Office & Professional Employees Union Local 225, which negotiates collective agreements on their behalf.

== Executive ==
The current National Executive is:

- Rubina Boucher – National President
- Helen King – National Executive Vice-president
- National Vice-president, BC/YT – Jaspinder Badesha
- National Vice-president, Alberta, NorthWest Territories, and Nunavut – Sabino Spagnuolo
- National Vice President, Saskatchewan and Manitoba – Keri D’Avignon-Nault
- National Vice-president, Ontario – Lisa Prescott
- National Vice-president, Ontario – Julie Nanquil
- National Vice-president, National Capital region – Dan Carrière
- National Vice-president, Quebec – Judith Côté
- National Vice-president, Quebec – Annik Beamish
- National Vice-president, Nova Scotia/Newfoundland and Labrador – Debbie Morris
- National Vice-president, New Brunswick/PEI – Charlene Arsenault
- National Vice-president for Women's Issues – Western Region – Lynda MacLellan
- National Vice-president for Women's Issues – Eastern Region – Carolyn Locke
- National Vice-president for Immigration and Refugee Board (IRB) – Vivian Ike
- National Vice-president for Immigration, Refugee and Citizenship Canada (IRCC) – Shauna-Lee Dupuis
- National Vice-president for Human Rights – Mofizul Islam
