= Agriculture Union =

- Agriculture Union
- Founded: 1960
- Headquarters: Ottawa, Ontario
- Location: Canada
- Members: 8,000 (2012)
- Key people: Milton Dyck, president
- Affiliations: Public Service Alliance of Canada
- Website: www.agrunion.com

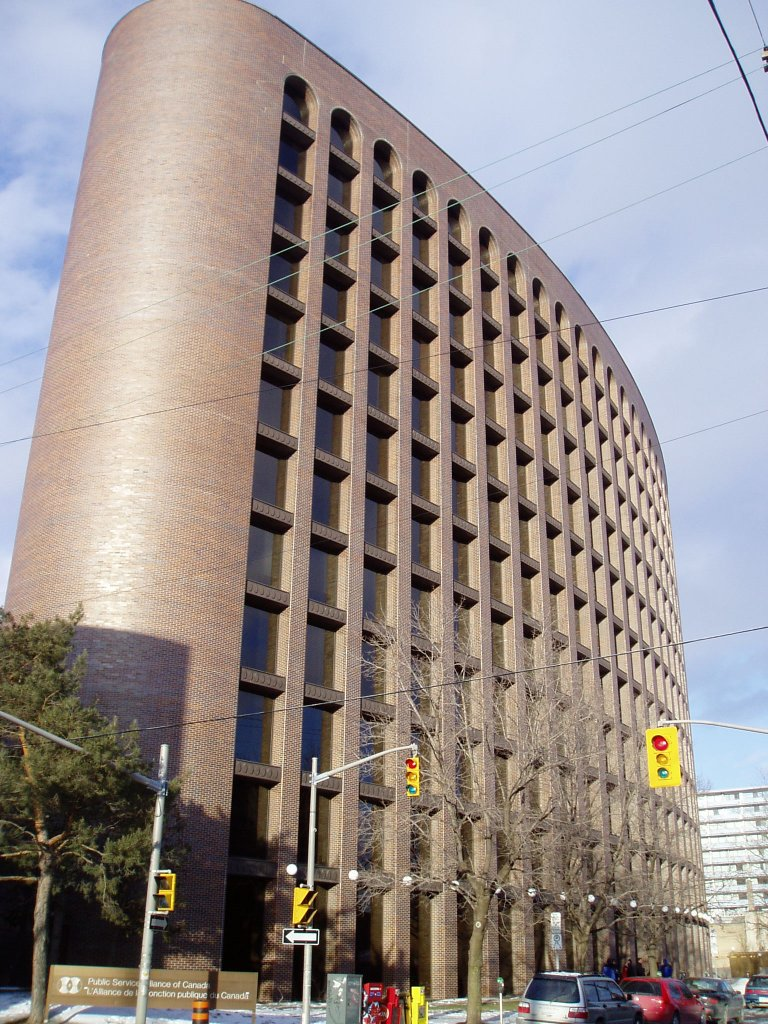
The Public Service Alliance of Canada Building in Ottawa.

The Agriculture Union is an affiliate of the Public Service Alliance of Canada (PSAC). It has more than 8,000 members who work for Canadian federal government departments and agencies such as the:

- Canadian Food Inspection Agency
- Agriculture & Agri-Food Canada, including
  - Agri-Environment Services Branch
  - Canada Agricultural Review Tribunal
  - Canadian Pari-Mutuel Agency
- Canadian Grain Commission
- Canadian Dairy Commission
- Public Service Commission
- Department of National Defence (language training)
- Canada School of Public Service

== History ==
In 1960 the Canada Agriculture National Employees' Association (CANEA), a national organization, was created to represent Canada Agriculture employees across Canada. In 1967, the CANEA became the newly formed Agriculture Union of the PSAC. The new Agriculture Union became one of the 16 founding staffing associations, representing almost 40 occupational groups, at the Presidents' Conference on Unity which negotiated a merger to form the PSAC.

=== COVID-19 ===
On 11 May 2020, the embedded inspectors at slaughterhouses (as represented by the AU) said that CFIA management is "threatening disciplinary action against employees who refuse to be reassigned to work at COVID-19-infected meat plants", while Deputy PM Chrystia Freeland said that "those who feel unsafe won't be forced back to work."

== Executive ==
2021-2023 Term

- Milton Dyck, President
- Patrick St-Georges, 1st National Executive Vice President
- Randy Olynyk, 2nd National Executive Vice President
- Dorothy McRae, 3rd National Executive Vice President
- Audrey St-Germain, 4th National Executive Vice President
