= Marcel Proulx =

Canadian politician

Member of the Canadian Parliament for Hull—Aylmer
- In office 1999–2011
- Preceded by: Marcel Massé
- Succeeded by: Nycole Turmel

Chief Opposition Whip
- In office 7 September 2010 – 2 May 2011
- Preceded by: Karen Redman
- Succeeded by: Nycole Turmel

Personal details
- Born: 6 March 1946 (age 80) L'Orignal, Ontario
- Party: Liberal
- Spouse: Pamela Proulx
- Relations: Edmond Proulx, grandfather Isidore Proulx, great-grandfather
- Profession: administrator, businessman, executive assistant

Marcel Proulx (/ˈpruː/; born 6 March 1946 in L'Orignal, Ontario) is a retired Canadian politician.

Proulx is a former member of the Liberal Party of Canada in the House of Commons of Canada, having represented the riding of Hull—Aylmer from 1999 to 2011. Proulx is a former administrator, businessman, claim adjuster, and executive assistant. He is a former Parliamentary Secretary to the Minister of Transport and is the current Chair of the Sub-Committee on Private Members' Business of the Standing Committee on Procedure and House Affairs and Deputy Chair of Committees of the Whole, frequently being the Acting Speaker.

Proulx ran for Speaker of the House of Commons of Canada in the 39th Canadian Parliament. Fellow Liberal Peter Milliken won on the first ballot.

Marcel Proulx was a supporter of Michael Ignatieff during the last leadership campaign of the Liberal Party of Canada. However, he served as Quebec lieutenant for Stéphane Dion in 2007. On 16 October 2007, after much speculation, Proulx announced his resignation as Quebec lieutenant. The position of Quebec Lieutenant was offered to Pablo Rodriguez and Denis Coderre but both refused. The position was later given to Senator Céline Hervieux-Payette.

He was defeated by NDP candidate Nycole Turmel in the 2011 Canadian election in a landslide. Turmel would also succeed him as the Chief Opposition Whip in the 41st Canadian Parliament.

He is the first Liberal candidate ever defeated in Hull-Aylmer's 94-year history. Proulx became a real estate agent a few months after his defeat.

== Electoral record ==
2011 Canadian federal election
Party	Candidate	Votes	%	±%	Expenditures
New Democratic	Nycole Turmel	35,194	59.20%	+39.37%	
Liberal	Marcel Proulx	12,051	20.27%	-17.20%	
Conservative	Nancy Brassard-Fortin	6,058	10.19%	-4.94%	
Bloc Québécois	Dino Lemay	5,019	8.44%	-13.63%	
Green	Roger Fleury	1,125	1.89%	-3.37%	
Total valid votes/Expense limit		59,447	100.00%		
Total rejected ballots		355	–		
Turnout		59,802	–		

2008 Canadian federal election: Hull—Aylmer
Party	Candidate	Votes	%	Expenditures
Liberal	Marcel Proulx	19,750	37.45	$79,057
Bloc Québécois	Raphaël Déry	11,625	22.05	$69,097
New Democratic	Pierre Ducasse	10,454	19.83	$45,531
Conservative	Paul Fréchette	7,996	15.16	$56,752
Green	Frédéric Pouyot	2,784	5.28	$3,327
Marxist–Leninist	Gabriel Girard-Bernier	121	0.23	none listed
Total valid votes/expenditure limit		52,730	100.00	$89,492
Total rejected ballots		359		
Turnout		53,089	61.00	
Electors on the lists		87,036		

2006 Canadian federal election: Hull—Aylmer
Party	Candidate	Votes	%	Expenditures
Liberal	Marcel Proulx	17,576	32.67	$74,347
Bloc Québécois	Alain Charette	15,788	29.35	$36,796
Conservative	Gilles Poirier	9,284	17.26	$57,405
New Democratic	Pierre Laliberté	8,334	15.49	$28,016
Green	Christian Doyle	2,687	4.99	$1,907
Marxist–Leninist	Gabriel Girard-Bernier	125	0.23	$19
Total valid votes/expenditure limit		53,794	100.00	$82,541
Total rejected ballots		323		
Turnout		54,117	64.25	
Electors on the lists		84,233		
Sources: Official Results, Elections Canada and Financial Returns, Elections Canada.

2004 Canadian federal election
Party	Candidate	Votes	%	±%	Expenditures
Liberal	Marcel Proulx	20,135	41.87	-9.53	$61,882
Bloc Québécois	Alain Charette	15,626	32.49	+9.41	$22,285
New Democratic	Pierre Laliberté	5,709	11.87	+8.38	$23,285
Conservative	Pierrette Bellefeuille	3,963	8.24	-9.72	$11,618
Green	Gail Walker	2,561	5.33	–	$2,380
Marxist–Leninist	Christian Legeais	98	0.20	-0.04	
Total valid votes/Expense limit		48,092	100.00	$81,460	

Note: Conservative vote is compared to the total of the Canadian Alliance vote and Progressive Conservative vote in the 2000 election.

2000 Canadian federal election
Party	Candidate	Votes	%	±%
Liberal	Marcel Proulx	22,385	51.40	-2.63
Bloc Québécois	Caroline Brouard	10,051	23.08	-2.40
Progressive Conservative	Guy Dufort	4,181	9.60	+1.39
Alliance	Michel Geisterfer	3,639	8.36	+7.36
New Democratic	Peter Piening	1,521	3.49	-4.19
Marijuana	Aubert Martins	892	2.05	
Natural Law	Rita Bouchard	426	0.98	+0.39
Independent	Ron Gray	184	0.42	
Canadian Action	Robert Brooks	167	0.38	
Marxist–Leninist	Alexandre Legeais	106	0.24	
Total valid votes		43,552	100.00	

Note: Canadian Alliance vote is compared to the Reform vote in 1999 by-election.

Canadian federal by-election, 15 November 1999
Party	Candidate	Votes	%	±%
Resignation of Marcel Massé, 10 September 1999
Liberal	Marcel Proulx	9,532	54.03	-0.08
Bloc Québécois	Robert Bélanger	4,495	25.48	+4.70
Progressive Conservative	Richard St-Cyr	1,448	8.21	-9.51
New Democratic	Alain Cossette	1,356	7.69	+4.93
Green	Gail Walker	307	1.74	+0.51
Christian Heritage	Ron Gray	176	1.00	+0.42
Reform	Luiz Da Silva	175	0.99	-0.97
Natural Law	Jean-Claude Pommet	103	0.58	+0.03
Independent	John C. Turmel	51	0.29	
Total valid votes		17,643	100.00	
