= 2023 Canadian federal worker strike =

Strike by federal workers in Canada in 2023

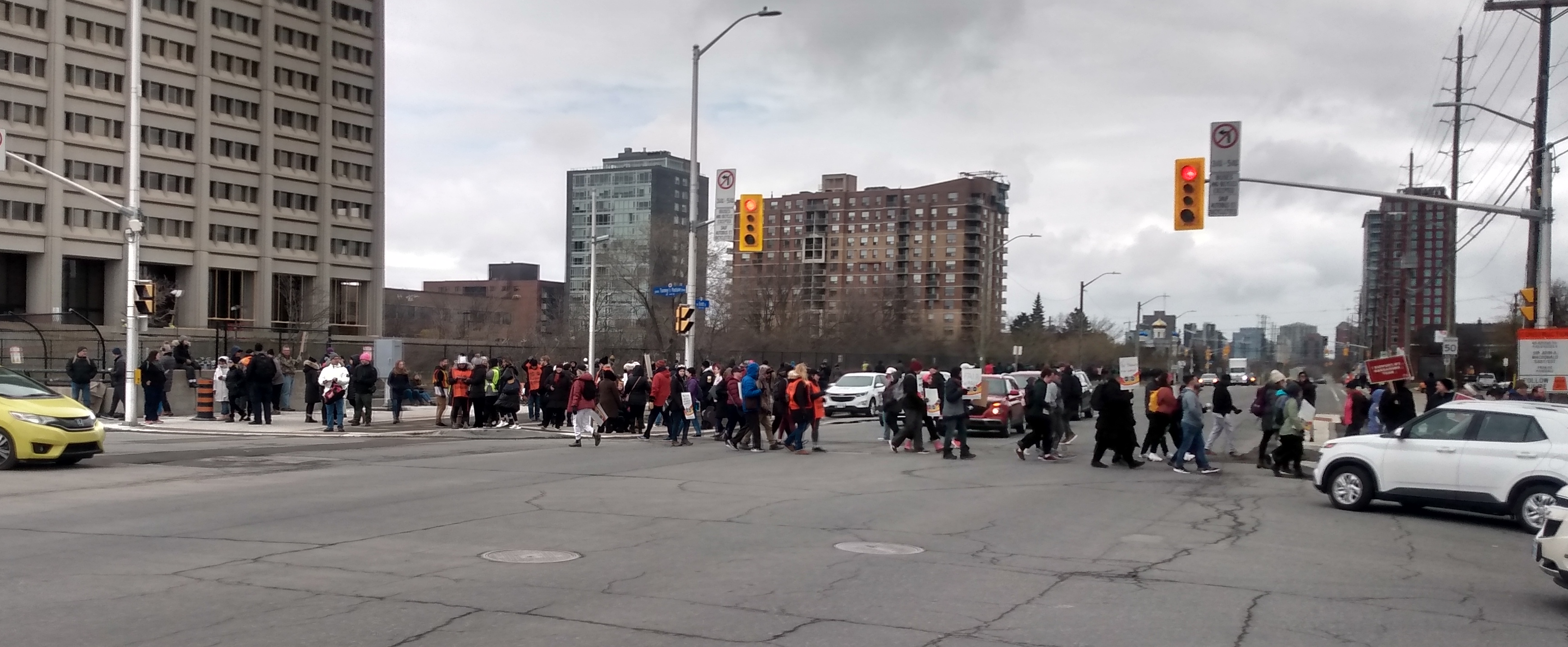
- PSAC strikers outside of Tunney's Pasture in Ottawa, Ontario
- Date: April 19, 2023 – April 30, 2023 (12 days) (Treasury Board bargaining units); April 19, 2023 – May 3, 2023 (15 days) (Union of Taxation Employees)
- Location: Canada
- Methods: Strike action; Work stoppage; Picketing
- Status: Stopped

Parties
Public Service Alliance of Canada (PSAC); Union of Taxation Employees (UTE)	Government of Canada

Lead figures
Chris Aylward (National President, PSAC); Sharon DeSousa (National Executive Vice-President, PSAC); Alex Silas (Regional Executive Vice-President, National Capital Region, PSAC); Marc Brière (National President, UTE)	Justin Trudeau (Prime Minister); Mona Fortier (President of the Treasury Board); Greg Fergus (Parliamentary Secretary to the Prime Minister and Parliamentary Secretary to the President of the Treasury Board); Diane Lebouthillier (Minister of National Revenue)

Number
approx. 159,000 employees	

The 2023 Canadian federal worker strike was a strike by Canadian federal workers who are members of the Public Service Alliance of Canada (PSAC). The strike took place between April 19 and May 3, 2023, although the Treasury Board bargaining units ended their strike on May 1.

The strike was the culmination of more than a year of collective bargaining following the expiry of the previous collective agreement in 2021, with it ultimately resulting from disagreements between PSAC and the Government of Canada (represented in bargaining by the Treasury Board of Canada Secretariat) on issues related to remote work, enhanced work amenities and wage increases to compensate for inflation. It affected several federal programs, including passport renewals and immigration processing. The strike was also expected to have an impact on tax season, such as processing delays, with the deadline for taxes having remained unchanged at April 30, 2023 (May 1, 2023, since April 30 was a Sunday).

Early on May 1, PSAC announced that a tentative agreement had been reached for the PA, SV, TC, and EB bargaining units and that workers in these units were required to return to work at 9 a.m. ET on May 1, or their next scheduled shift after that date. Workers from the Union of Taxation Employees (UTE) bargaining unit continued to strike until a tentative agreement was announced on May 3, ending the strike altogether, at which point they were required to return to work by May 4 at 11:30 a.m. ET at the latest.

== Background ==
The Public Service Alliance of Canada (PSAC) is the largest public sector union in Canada, representing 159,000 public service workers, of which 120,000 fall under the Treasury Board of Canada and 39,000 are Canada Revenue Agency (CRA) employees under the Union of Taxation Employees (UTE) component of PSAC.

Prior work contracts for PSAC workers had expired in 2021. Since June 2021, PSAC had been bargaining with the Government of Canada to establish a new contract, largely as an attempt to increase worker pay to keep up with a surge of inflation, which had precipitated an increase in the cost of living. CRA workers sought a 30% increase in wages over the next three years, while others were asking for a 13.5% increase, amounting to a 4.5% annual increase. The Government of Canada had offered a 9% increase instead, but PSAC would not accept it. In addition, PSAC repeatedly called for an agreement regarding remote work, in spite of a December 2022 mandate by the Treasury Board that requires workers to work from government offices at least 40–60% of the time (two to three days per week in most cases). The union had also pushed for greater anti-racism training and increased limits on contract work.

In May 2022, the union went to a labour board, leading to the release of a non-binding report in January 2023. The report recommended increased allowances for employees, and enhancements of family leave, shift premiums, and flexibilities. A press release disclosed that the government would enter into meditation with PSAC in April.

Both the Government of Canada and the union agreed that workers needed an increase in wages. However, the size of the wage increase was subject to negotiation. Despite attempts to reach a consensus, discussions between the parties were slow to progress. As a result, on February 22, 2023, a strike vote of the membership was held by the Treasury Board component of PSAC. The UTE component of PSAC held a strike vote on January 31. The Treasury Board bargaining units entered a legal strike position on April 12, followed by the UTE bargaining unit on April 14.

== Strike ==
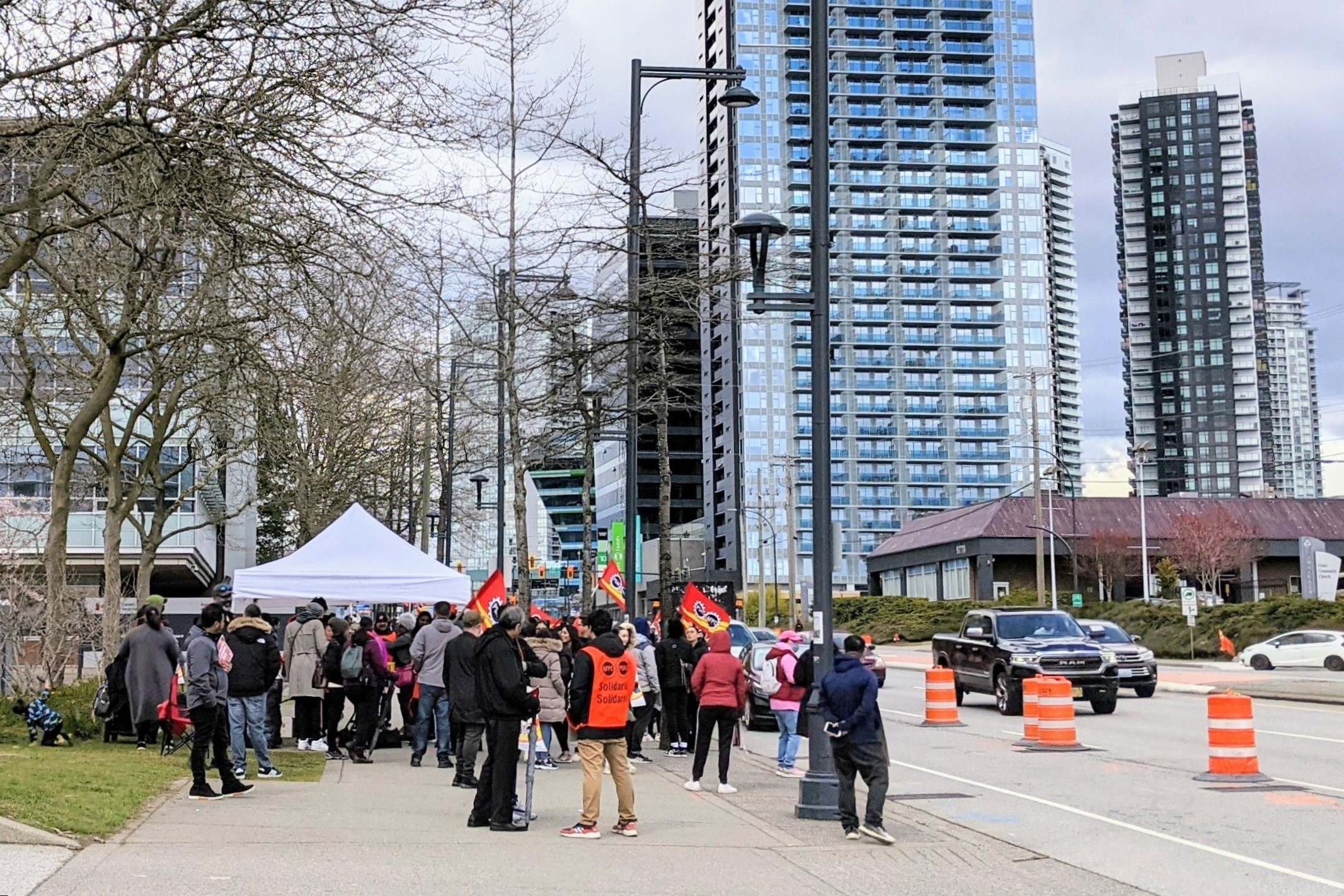
PSAC strikers outside a CRA office in Surrey, British Columbia

On April 7, the CRA bargaining group voted to enter a legal strike position. On April 12, the national president of PSAC, Chris Aylward, announced that the Treasury Board bargaining unit had voted overwhelmingly in favour of entering into a legal strike position, thus granting the group a 60-day window to initiate a labour strike. On April 19 at 12:01 a.m. ET, the strike began. Approximately 100,000 of the 159,000 PSAC members left their jobs in order to picket at hundreds of locations across the country. However, approximately 30,000–46,000 jobs (including approximately 8,600 Canada Border Services Agency workers who constitute PSAC's FB bargaining unit) were deemed essential (i.e., they were considered necessary to the safety or security of the public or a segment of the public), meaning these workers could not participate in a strike and needed to continue to work, nor could strikers impede essential workers' access to their workplaces.

=== National Capital Region ===
In the National Capital Region, striking workers had been demonstrating at 13 different picket locations, including in front of the Office of the Prime Minister and Privy Council, Parliament Hill, the Treasury Board office, the Tourism Minister's office, the Department of National Defence office, the Canada Revenue Agency office, Tunney's Pasture, Canada Post headquarters, the Department of Finance, as well as the offices of MPs Greg Fergus, Mona Fortier, Marie-France Lalonde, and Steven MacKinnon.

=== Nationwide ===
Workers struck at various locations throughout Canada, including passport offices in Ontario, the Parole Office in Edmonton, the Natural Resources Canada office in Vancouver, the Canada Pension Plan office in Victoria, military bases in Quebec, as well as local offices in Winnipeg, New Brunswick, Newfoundland, Nova Scotia, and Prince Edward Island.

== Negotiations ==
On April 24, Mona Fortier wrote an open letter to public servants and Canadians, in which she identified four main areas of disagreement that remained between the government and PSAC: wages, teleworking, outsourcing contracts, and seniority rules in the event of a layoff. PSAC responded to this letter by reiterating their desire to reach a "fair deal". On April 26, Fortier released a statement, in which she expressed frustration with the offers tabled by PSAC negotiators. On April 28, the Treasury Board of Canada Secretariat presented a "final updated comprehensive offer that addresses all remaining PSAC demands", without releasing details of the offer to the public. The same day, PSAC confirmed that it received the offer, but expected negotiations to continue into the weekend. In the early hours of May 1, at around 1:20 a.m. ET, PSAC confirmed that they had reached a tentative agreement for the PA, SV, TC, and EB bargaining units at the Treasury Board, and that these groups would be required to return to work at 9 a.m. ET on May 1, or their next scheduled shift after that date.

== Impacts ==
=== Impacts on federal programs, services, and operations ===
In a press conference on April 19, 2023, ministers Mona Fortier (President of the Treasury Board), Karina Gould (families, children and social development), Diane Lebouthillier (national revenue), and Sean Fraser (immigration, refugees and citizenship) outlined impacts of the strike on certain federal programs and operations. Among these impacts were delays in processing income tax returns and immigration applications, as well as providing passports only in humanitarian or emergency situations.

While essential services continued to be delivered during the labour disruption, Canadians could expect others to be delayed or interrupted. The following table lists these disruptions:

Department/Agency	Impact(s)
Agriculture and Agri-Food Canada	Programs and services that may have been affected: Agriculture and agri-food research centres; AgriInvest; AgriStability; Industrial Program of the Saint-Hyacinthe Research and Development Centre; Poultry and Egg On-Farm Investment Program; Wine Sector Support Program; Youth Employment and Skills Program; Federal programs under the Sustainable Canadian Agricultural Partnership; The Agriculture and Agri-Food Canada Contact Centre could also have experienced disruptions and delays and may have been unable to take calls.
Atlantic Canada Opportunities Agency	Some client services may have been affected.
Canada Revenue Agency	Delays in processing some income tax and benefit returns, particularly those filed by paper, and increased wait times in contact centres. Other impacts included: Individual tax enquiries lines were open with reduced agent capacity. Priority was given to callers who needed to file a tax return to obtain family or child benefits. All paper returns and mail sent to the CRA (e.g., through drop boxes) were stockpiled for future processing.; E-services; My Account; Letters containing the CRA security code were not mailed to Canadians who register for the CRA's online services.; Canadians wishing to register for online services including My Account for Individuals, My Business Account (MyBA) and/or Represent a Client (RAC) were unable to complete their registration and have full online access.; Online chat with a CRA agent was closed.; Payments; The Debt Management Call Centre was closed.; There may have been delays in processing payments made by cheque or in person at financial institutions.; Business; The Business Tax Enquiries line was closed.; Potential delays in some audit programs.; The Liaison Officer service, which offers free tax help for small business owners and self-employed individuals, was paused. Previously scheduled appointments were rescheduled as soon as possible following full service resumption.; GST/HST: the Excise and GST/HST Rulings and Interpretations Service was open with reduced capacity.; Trust Returns (T3): processing was on hold for all returns that required additional assessment support.; Excise and specialty taxes; The Excise and Specialty Tax Directorate enquiries line remained in operation at reduced capacity.; Activities that remained in operation at reduced capacity: Application processing.; Responses to general or technical enquiries on excise stamps.; Requests for rulings and interpretations.; The Northern Service Centres had paused in-person operations.; The Charities and giving enquiries line was closed.; Request for relief of penalties and interest were not being processed. Processing delays were expected when operations resumed.; The leads reporting and Voluntary Disclosure telephone lines were closed.
Canada School of Public Service	Some services may have been affected, including the cancellation of upcoming events, courses, programs, and Client Contact Centre response times.
Canadian Coast Guard	Services partially or fully disrupted: Wrecked, abandoned or hazardous vessels program
Canadian Heritage	Service standards for the delivery of its funding programs may have affected the following three transactions: Acknowledgement of receipt of application; Funding decision; Issuance of payments
Canadian Transportation Agency	Services partially or fully disrupted: Dispute Resolution activities may be subject to delays.; Information provision activities will likely be delayed, for example: Provision of information about programs and services; Responding to telephone calls; Responding to inquiries via email or through the Secretariat's email
Correctional Service of Canada	Some services may have been affected.
Department of National Defence	Approximately 700 soldiers at Garrison Petawawa were left without heat or hot water after 505 employees went on strike.
Employment and Social Development Canada	Services partially or fully disrupted: Passport services; Grants and contributions programs; Temporary Foreign Worker Program; Canada Education Savings Grant; Canada Learning Bond; Canada Disability Savings Grant and Canada Disability Savings Bond; Job Bank; Biometrics collection
Federal Economic Development Agency for Southern Ontario	Minimal impact on project and program proponents.
Fisheries and Oceans Canada	Services partially or fully disrupted: Indigenous Funding Programs; Licensing; Exporting and importing fish; Fisheries Management Decisions; Aquatic Invasive Species; Aquaculture Management; Marine Mammal Response; Small Craft Harbours
Global Affairs Canada	Services partially or fully impacted: Services at missions abroad: delays in consular services, including citizenship and passport services.; Document authentication services: longer response time for enquiries, delayed review and processing of requests for authentication services, or a delay in the return of authenticated documents.; Import and export permits: potential service delays for a small number of permit recipients.; CanExport Program: potential delays in processing applications, claims and payments.; International Assistance Programming: funding provided to Canadian and international partners in support of poverty reduction, peace and security, and other global issues may have been impacted by potential labour disruptions. These impacts could have meant a longer response time for enquiries, delayed review of applications, and delayed payments to grant and contribution recipients.
Immigration and Refugee Board of Canada	Services partially or fully disrupted: Hearings, other than detention reviews, have been delayed or may not have taken place; Processing of files have been delayed; Access to Information and Privacy services may have been delayed; Delays should be expected with: Responses to phone, fax, or email enquiries; Receiving email or documents
Immigration, Refugees and Citizenship Canada	Services partially or fully disrupted: Access to Information Act requests: longer processing times.; Biometric Collection appointments in Canada were unavailable for the duration of the labour disruption.; Citizenship events: citizenship events were rescheduled. Some urgent applications may still have been processed.; Consular citizenship and passport services: potential delays with citizenship or passport services outside of Canada.; Contacting IRCC; Client Support Centre response times: the IRCC Client Support Centre was experiencing service delays. Longer response times were to be expected.; Social media: unable to answer social media enquiries.; IRCC web form response times: longer response times were to be expected when using the IRCC web form.; Grants and contributions services: urgent requests from funded recipients were answered, although delays in response times were expected.; Immigration-related appointments: in-person appointments may have been rescheduled.; Clients with immigration-related appointments in Canada were contacted to reschedule or cancel appointments.; Passport services: most domestic passport services were not available. Delays were to be expected in the processing of passport applications.; Domestic Passport services: Service Canada only processed domestic passport applications for emergency and humanitarian situations. Passport services were available only at specialized passport sites. Humanitarian/emergency situations were defined as: Passport clients who were at risk of financial hardship.; Passport clients who relied on travel as a source of employment, and their income security would be jeopardized.; Passport clients who needed to travel for medical reasons, or had had a death or illness in the family.; Passport clients whose situation was deemed urgent on compassionate grounds.; Passport applications that did not meet these criteria would not be processed when employees were striking. Delivery times exceeded published service standards.; Passport services for Canadians living outside of Canada: clients may have experienced delays.; Processing applications: there was limited capacity during a strike, so delays in processing were to be expected. This included delays to applications that were already being prioritized.
Indigenous Services Canada	Services that may have been impacted: Potential delays in processing requests, increased wait times in contact centres, or regional offices that close temporarily. Affected services may have included: Obtaining, renewing, or replacing a status card; Indian status; Non-insured health benefits; Submitting a request under Jordan's Principle; Supporting Inuit children; Treaty annuities, estates, and trust; Schools: federally operated schools on-reserve may have closed temporarily or may have needed to suspend in-person classes. Affected schools: In Ontario, there were five federally operated schools in Six Nations of the Grand River and one school located on Tyendinaga Mohawk Territory. All federally operated schools in First Nations communities in Ontario were closed during a labour disruption.
Library and Archives Canada	Services partially or fully disrupted: Ordering Archival Material: this service was not available.; Ordering Published Material: this service was not available.; Requesting Copies: this service was not available.; Asking a Reference Question and asking a Genealogy Question: delays were expected in processing requests and appointments for reference or genealogy help.; Making an ATIP request: all ATIP services were affected as the vast majority of LAC employees fell under the collective agreement under negotiation. In this context, the following types of requests were prioritized: urgent requests for health reasons for Canadian Armed Forces veterans and requests made in the context of litigations and class actions that had time sensitive deadlines.; Services to Publishers: possible delays in processing requests.; Making licensing or copyright requests: delays were expected in responses.
Prairies Economic Development Canada	Some services may have been affected. Any impact on programs and project proponents was expected to be minimal.
Public Safety Canada	Potential delays in the rollout of funding for community projects and other programs administered by Public Safety Canada.
Public Service Commission of Canada	Second language evaluation services were reduced, delayed, or unavailable. This included scheduling and administering oral language assessments and tests for reading comprehension and written expression.
Public Services and Procurement Canada	Services partially or fully disrupted: Canada Gazette; Direct deposit (only phone assistance was disrupted); Direct deposit for individuals with a foreign bank account; Direct deposit help centre; Signing up for direct deposit or updating information; International contract security requirements; Publications from the Government of Canada; Security screening; Obtaining a security screening for an organization; Personnel security screening processes
Royal Canadian Mounted Police	Services like administrative support, media relations, web updates, and public access to buildings where RCMP are located may have been disrupted. Questions from the public or media may not have been answered in a timely manner.
Transport Canada	Potential delays in accessing points of service. Services partially or fully disrupted: Public outreach; Regulatory work; Aircraft services; Services such as issuance of licenses, certificates, and registrations; Motor vehicle safety 1-800 defect complaints and recalls hotline, defect complaint analysis, defect investigations, and recall oversight; Transportation security clearances; 1-888 service for ordering TC publications and forms, and answering questions on products; Incentives for Zero-Emission Vehicles (iZEV) Program and the Incentives for Medium- and Heavy-Duty Zero-Emission Vehicles (iMHZEV) Program
Veterans Affairs Canada	Significantly reduced capacity to process new payments. Any applications for benefits already in the queue or that were received after a service disruption were prioritized based on urgency or critical need. This meant potential disruptions for access to services including: In-person appointments; Career Transition Services; Education and Training Benefit; Disability Benefits; Caregiver Recognition Benefit; Case Management Services; Health Care Benefits and Services; National Contact Centre Network (call centre); Delays in appointments for in-person services at area offices could have occurred, with in-person services at smaller area offices either stopped or reduced. Longer wait times for calls placed to the National Client Call Centre and delays responding to messages sent through My VAC Account were anticipated.

=== Economic impacts ===
The Canadian government had claimed that the strike would not affect the normal flow of people and goods in and out of the country. However, the previous federal strike of this magnitude (in 1991) resulted in delays of some international commodity shipments and disruptions of flights and international travel.

It was speculated by Charles St-Arnaud, chief economist at Alberta Central, that the magnitude of the wage increase resulting from negotiations could prompt other unions to follow suit, which could be inflationary, because if more people ask for higher wages, this can sustain the inflationary cycle by increasing consumers' purchasing power, which in turn stimulates demand for more goods and services and therefore puts price pressures on costs. Since the labour market is tight, private companies might have to match public salaries to keep prospects from going to work for the government. However, regardless of the magnitude of the wage increase, the private sector have the capacity to absorb costs rather than raise their prices, and the Bank of Canada has the capacity to control a potential increase in demand (resulting from higher wages) by increasing interest rates, thus potentially limiting the ability of other unions to secure comparable gains.

Modelling from the Conference Board of Canada suggested that household income in Ottawa–Gatineau would decrease by $44 million per week, representing 5% of total wages and salaries in the CMA, since strike pay was significantly below workers' regular salary. As a result, a prolonged strike would impact consumer-facing businesses such as restaurants and retailers the most, and the strike could have broader impacts on the Canadian economy due to the prolonged disruption to government services and programs. As well, since workers on strike did not receive their regular pay (and were instead paid by the union), government spending was reduced (although likely by a less-than-proportinate amount to the foregone salaries), which would negatively impact nominal GDP.

== Reactions ==
The Canadian Federation of Independent Business, in an April 19 press release authored by its president, Dan Kelly, expressed concern over the strike's impacts. It urged the Government of Canada to ensure that all departments maintain full service to small business, continue negotiation "to ensure a long-term and affordable collective bargaining agreement is signed", and prepare back-to-work legislation "should strike action last more than a few days". Restaurants Canada also expressed concern over the impacts of the strike, particularly on the foodservice industry and on small and medium-sized businesses more broadly.

NDP leader Jagmeet Singh expressed his support for federal workers ahead of the strike vote. He also expressed that the NDP would not back any back-to-work legislation that may be put forth by the Liberals. This sentiment was shared by the Canadian Labour Congress in an April 19 letter written by its president, Bea Bruske, to Mona Fortier, opposing the push by the Canadian Federation of Independent Business for back-to-work legislation.

Conservative MP Stephanie Kusie commented on the strike by criticizing prime minister Justin Trudeau's actions since he took office in 2015, attributing the strike to inflation, an increased public service budget, and increased spending on external consulting.
