= Union of Postal Communications Employees =

- Union of Postal Communications Employees
- Founded: 1966
- Headquarters: Ottawa, Ontario
- Location: Canada
- Members: 2,720 (2012)
- Key people: Yvan Bélanger, president
- Affiliations: Public Service Alliance of Canada
- Website: www.upce.ca

The Union of Postal Communications Employees is a Canadian public employee labour union.

On March 1, 1967, the Post Office Component, whose origin goes back to the convention meeting of the Railway Mail Clerks in Ottawa in November 1966, joined the Public Service Alliance of Canada. At the Postal Communications Component convention in Halifax in August 1975, the delegates voted to change the name of their component to the Union of Postal Communications Employees (UPCE).

UPCE has members in 2 different bargaining units. The largest of these is the Canada Post group with approximately 2,600 members. The other bargaining unit is situated in British Columbia and these approximately 120 members are employed by Purolator Courier Ltd. The Purolator bargaining unit members perform clerical and administrative duties.
