= Black Class Action =

Canadian Federal lawsuit

- Court: Federal Court of Canada
- Full case name: Nicholas Marcus Thompson et al V. His Majesty the King
- Citation: T-1458-20

Court membership
- Judges sitting: Associate Chief Justice Jocelyne Gagné
- Associate judges: Benoit Duchesne

Keywords
- Black class action, systemic discrimination, racism, Canada

Nicholas Marcus Thompson Et Al V. His Majesty The King (T-1458-20) is a landmark case known as the Black Class Action filed with the Federal Court of Canada on December 1, 2020. It is the largest and most high-profile discrimination and harassment case related to employment in the federal public service. The $2.5-billion claim seeks damages on behalf of current and former Black public servants who were denied promotions because of their race and any Black individuals who have applied for jobs in the federal public service dating back to 1970 but were not successful due to their race.

The Black Class Action Secretariat is a registered non-for-profit organization that is coordinating the legal action.

== Background ==
In June 2020, Canadian Prime Minister Justin Trudeau, acknowledged that systemic discrimination existed in all institutions. Nicholas Marcus Thompson is a social justice advocate and a union leader in Canada. Mr Thompson is the organiser and lead plaintiff of the Black Class Action lawsuit against the federal government for systemic workplace discrimination against Black Canadians.

Mr Thompson advocated for measures to address anti-Black discrimination at the Canada Revenue Agency. He lobbied the Minister of National Revenue, Dianne Lebouthiller, the Clerk Of the Privy Council Ian Shuggart and Prime Minister Justin Trudeau. Mr Thompson then organized Black workers from various federal public sector institutions including the Canada Revenue Agency, Canadian Human Rights Commission, the Royal Canadian Mounted Police and Public Prosecution Service of Canada and filed the $900 million class-action lawsuit against the entire federal public service. Former crown attorney Courtney Betty is leading the legal team representing the plaintiffs.

The Statement of Claim was amended on May 13, 2021. The amended claim proposes an increase in reparations, from $900-million to $2.5-billion, to cover losses in income, opportunities, and pension values and other benefits stemming from a lack of promotion for Black employees within the public service.

Following the filing of the lawsuit on December 2, 2020, the Clerk of the Privy Council Ian Shuggart issued a call to action on January 22, 2021, on Anti-racism, equity, and inclusion in the Federal Public Service. The Clerk called on public service leaders to appoint, sponsor and support Black workers as well as Indigenous and other underrepresented groups.

In the 2021 budget, the government amended the Public Service Employment Act aimed at removing barriers to hiring and promotions. Treasury Board spokesperson Martin Potvin said this was one of the steps the government has taken to tackle systemic discrimination in the federal workforce.

The 2021 budget also committed $250 million over five years to collect disaggregated data.

Following national protests in Canada after the murder of George Floyd in the United States and Black Canadians in Canada, heightened awareness was raised on anti-Black discrimination in Canada.

== What the claim seeks ==
The systemic discrimination class action lawsuit asks the federal government to adopt a policy that ensures the number of Black employees is representative of the percentage of Black people in the general population and that they are represented at all levels of employment. The claim further requests that a compensation fund be established, alongside a Black Equity Commission that will serve to implement solutions on addressing institutional discrimination.

== Mental Health Fund ==
On July 9, 2021, the group filed a motion in the Federal Court to order an interim mental health fund of at least $100 million for current and former Black employees who require immediate support for trauma they've faced working in the public service. Representative plaintiff Nicholas Marcus Thompson said "damages that Black workers have faced and continue to face, it's real and it's ongoing" and that "some of our class members have shared that they've had suicidal attempts. They've thought about ending their life because it has become so challenging, so difficult to show up for work every day."

In the same month, organizations including the Federation of Black Canadians, Black North Initiative, Black Health Alliance, Taibu Community Health Centre and the Professional Institute of the Public Service of Canada issued a call to action to the Prime Minister of Canada calling for the establishment of a mental health program to address to unique challenges that Black public service workers face due to systemic discrimination.

On August 31, 2021, leader of the Liberal Party of Canada Justin Trudeau announced if his party is re-elected, the government would set up a fund for Black public servants’ mental health, which is a response to the class-action lawsuit

On December 16, 2021, Prime Minister Justin Trudeau turned the campaign promise into government policy by issuing a mandate to the president of the Treasury Board to "Establishing a mental health fund for Black public servants and supporting career advancement, training, sponsorship and educational opportunities"

Media reports from December 2022 indicated that this fund was in jeopardy as Black civil servants working on mental health program accused the Treasury Board Secretariat of racism.

The 2022, and 2023 federal budgets allocated $49.6 million to create a mental health fund for Black public servants and establish dedicated career development programs, including those to prepare Black public service leaders for executive positions.

== Employment Equity Act ==
The statement of claim alleges that the Employment Equity Act violates the Charter of Rights of Black employees and that it has failed to break down the category of “visible minorities,” ignoring the unique racism faced by Black employees. The plaintiffs are seeking an amendment to the Act to create a separate category for Black workers. Representative Plaintiff Nicholas Marcus Thompson said “one of the most important changes the government can make right now is to amend the Employment Equity Act and create a separate category for Black workers — apart from the ‘visible minority’ category,” which would “allow federal employers, and employers regulated by the federal government, to directedly address underrepresentation issues for Black workers.”

On July 14, 2021, the Government of Canada announced the 13-members task force led by Professor Adelle Blackett, to conduct the most expansive review of the Act since its inception.

On December 11, 2023, the Minister of Labour, Seamus O'Regan Jr. and Professor Blackett announced the release of the Employment Equity Act Review Task Force's final report. O’Regan Jr. stated that the government will recognize Black people as its own category under the Act.

== UN Human Rights Complaint ==
The Black Class Action Secretariat has formally filed a complaint against the federal government on behalf of Black civil servants with the United Nations Human Rights Council. "With this complaint, we are elevating Canada's past failures and failure to act in the present to an international body." said Nicholas Marcus Thompson. The Treasury Board president Mona Fortier responded to the complaint stating that "the Government of Canada is actively working to address harms and create a diverse and inclusive public service free of discrimination and harassment. Our workforce must be representative of the communities we serve, our federal workplaces should be welcoming, safe and supportive environments."

== Discrimination at Canadian Human Rights Commission ==
The Canadian Human Rights Commission is tasked with receiving and addressing complaints from employees within the federal public service, federally regulated workplaces and the Canadian public that has a discrimination complaint against of these organizations. The Government of Canada is seeking to dismiss the federal class action on the grounds that Black workers have redress at the Canadian Human Rights Commission. Media reports states that the Commission faces a "crisis of confidence" following findings that the body discriminated against its Black and racialized employees and rejected race-based from the Canadian public.

In March 2023, the Treasury Board of Canada Secretariat, the government's human resources arm, ruled that the Canadian Human Rights Commission discriminated against its own Black and racialized employees. In December 2023, the Senate Human Rights Committee released its report "Anti-Black Racism, Sexism and Systemic Discrimination in the Canadian Human Rights Commission", which found that the commission faces a "crisis of confidence" regarding its discriminatory practices.

On February 26, 2024 a coalition of unions and human rights groups filed an international complaint against the Canadian Human Rights Commission, based on the discriminatory findings against the commission, by the Treasury Board Secretariat and the Senate Human Rights Committee. The complaint states that the discriminatory findings against the commission means that the body is violating international human rights laws, including the International Convention on the Elimination of All Forms of Racism. The complaint further states that the Commission is violating the Paris Principles which requires human rights institutions to promote and protect human rights without discrimination of any kind.

On June 7, 2024 the United Nations-affiliated accreditation body, the Global Alliance of National Human Rights Institutions, through its Sub Committee on Accreditation, issued its decision on the complaint, stating that the complaint "raises concerns about the continued compliance of the Canadian Human Rights Commission with the Paris Principles, including its ability to conduct its mandate in an efficient manner and its perceived credibility in tackling systemic human rights violations. As a result, the body took the unprecedented step to initiate a Special Review of the accreditation of the Canadian Human Rights Commission.
