= Public Service 2000 =

The Public Service 2000 (PS2000) was a public service reform initiative that took place in the Canadian public service between 1989 and 1993. Borrowing heavily from the teachings of New Public Management, the PS2000 sought to update the public service by making it less complex, cheaper, more flexible, and efficient by removing red tape and implementing new management philosophies while decentralizing decision-making to better empower public servants to deliver services through personnel decision-making

Announced by Brian Mulroney's government in 1989, the PS2000 was distinct from other efforts to modernize the public service in that it would be led by the public service itself. Headed by the Clerk of the Privy Council with assistance from the Chairman of the Public Service Commission and the Secretary of the Treasury Board, a review of the public service was undertaken by ten task forces made up of 120 deputy and assistant deputy ministers and other senior public service officials resulting in over 300 recommendations being made to improve the public service. Ten areas for improvement were addressed by the task forces:

- Classification and Occupational Group Structures
- Training and Development
- Compensation and Benefits
- Work Force Adaptiveness
- Management Category
- Administrative Policy and Common Service Agencies
- Staff Relations
- Resource Management and Budget Controls
- Staffing
- Service to the Public

The task forces completed their research in 1990, and the recommendations were announced that December in a government white paper.

The PS2000 was moderately successful, implementing many of the recommendations that had been made to better modernize the public service and instill a service-oriented culture in the public service. Two annual reports were delivered to Parliament on the continuing efforts of the PS2000, as well as the passing of the Public Service Reform Act, 1992 as a result of the white paper.

However, through a series of events over 3 years the PS2000 was robbed of much of its initial momentum and optimism. A string of budget cuts as a result of a recession, a three-year wage freeze to public servants, and the Public Service Alliance of Canada's general strike (which would be the single largest Canadian union strike in history) would sour labor-management relations. Additionally, the “quiet crisis” of La Relève, the Al-Mashat affair of 1991, increased privatization of public services, and a change of government in 1993 would further hamper the PS2000's implementation. Still, the PS2000 was successful in implementing many of its suggestions through structural, cultural and legislative changes.

== History ==
The PS2000 was preceded by two Commissions that would later serve as both a basis and as inspiration for the institutional goals of the PS2000. The Glassco Commission (1962) recommended that public managers should be left to manage without so much government red tape while the Lambert Commission (1979) stressed the need to make public managers more accountable.

The need to update the Canadian public service had been growing more urgent over the decades following the Glassco Commission: in 1983 the Auditor General released the report "Constraints to Productive Management in the Public Service" which highlighted excessive bureaucracy that was reducing the public service's ability to deliver quality service as it had become more process-oriented than goal-oriented. In 1986, the Treasury Board enacted an initiative titled "Increased Ministerial Authority and Accountability" which hoped to give ministers and senior managers more autonomy and flexibility in their usage of government resources while also increasing their accountability towards following Treasury Board policies and satisfactory program delivery.

Although successful in enacting change, these initiatives failed to address the underlying cultural and structural changes that were needed to modernize the public service. With similar reforms taking place in New Zealand, Australia, and the United Kingdom coupled with the start of a second consecutive term of the Mulroney government, it seemed like an opportune time-frame to attempt a public service renewal. Several other factors were instrumental in the Prime Minister's decision to pursue an ambitious overhaul of workplace culture: the federal budget had been on-track with no foreseeable cuts in the future (although PS2000 was never financially motivated). Furthermore, the Clerk of the Privy Council (who would help oversee the implementation of the PS2000) had several years of experience working for the Mulroney government and was seen as a capable civil servant. Finally, the recently appointed Secretary of the Treasury Board was previously a Deputy Minister and understood the changes needed in the public service.

10 task forces were created, led by deputy ministers collaborating with assistant deputy ministers and senior public officials, to focus on three areas of improvement: 7 of the task forces would review human resources policy and practices, 2 reviewed administrative reform, and the final task force analyzed service to the public. The more than 300 recommendations would be compiled into a government white paper and announced as Public Service 2000 in December 1990.

== Recommendations ==
The task forces came back with over 300 recommendations to address the 10 areas covered by the PS2000. Many of these recommendations were "soft" changes to management (not easily measured or codified) but were specific enough so that their implementation could be verified. Clerk of the Privy Council Paul Tellier would call the PS2000 "10 percent legislative change, 20 percent change in systems, and 70 percent change in attitudes and practices".

=== Classification and Occupational Group Structures ===
The previous classification regime had been introduced in the 1967 Public Service Employment Act but began to be seen as overly complex by the early 1970s. The changes proposed by the PS2000 were seen as less ambitious than needed but were considered compromises in order to appeal to unions and make them easier to implement. Eliminating occupational categories, large reductions of occupational groups, the introduction of a common rating strategy as well as putting a 3-page limit on job descriptions were all recommendations that hoped to streamline public service employment and do away with an occupational hierarchy that had taken hold. Although the recommendation for job description page limits was never fully adopted, the other recommendations were seen as improvements by managers in pruning the public service organizational structure and allowing for more mobility for career development.

=== Training and Development ===
This task force met as a group 7 times between May 28 and July 13, 1990, completing its review on July 15, 1990. The task force was started after the other nine because it was believed its findings would be in some part based on the findings and needs for training of the other task forces. During these meetings, reviews of papers and studies pertaining to the public service and private sector training and development were reviewed while also meeting with union representatives from the National Joint Council and with workers from the Professional Institute of the Public Service of Canada and the Professional Association of Foreign Service Officers. In addition, it met with departmental heads of training and a coalition of federal training centre heads along with written briefs submitted from directors of personnel or assorted public servants.

The task force recommended better coordination between central agencies and to reduce resource constraints through departmental sharing of resources, information, technology and facilities. Additionally, the task force warned about a lack of investment into long-term training to help prepare career civil servants for more than just their immediate duties (an issue that would arise later on and need to be addressed in La Relève).

Due to the financial constraints of the 1990s, there was very little reported increase in training, although the prioritization of training changed: there was a greater focus on training public servants in customer service, cultural diversity, and science and technology while management focus shifted to conflict resolution, mentoring and leadership, and human resources management. Moreover, development training which was meant to help prepare public servants for long-term careers in the public service was ultimately a casualty of the budget cuts of the 1990s.

=== Compensation and Benefits ===
The PS2000 envisioned better rewards programs for exemplary employee service as well as restructuring benefits and increasing employee mobility. The unions would oppose changes to both pay structure that would give performance payments as well as changes to how benefits were allocated and the notion of being able to focus more on certain types of benefits. Many of the departments would adopt recognition programs for employees, but there was little change to mobility policy in the public service. Special leave and leave without pay policy was also changed to make returning to work or retirement easier on employees, but many of these changes have not been utilized due to employees not knowing of them.

=== Workforce Adaptiveness ===
A key focus of the PS2000 was increasing the flexibility of the public service. This flexibility would be codified in the Public Service Reform Act, 1992 which allowed managers to laterally transfer employees to other departments to assist where needed. Although employee consent is required to do so, and usefulness of this is limited, it did allow for shuffling of manpower around departments should it be needed. The task force also recommended the establishment of assignment offices to coordinate interdepartmental deployment: many departments have now done this. As well, the culture change sought by the PS2000 to allow for experimentation and goal-oriented service seems to have taken hold, with 3 out of 4 public servants stating they feel that they have the flexibility to adapt their services to meet their clients' needs.

=== Management Category ===
PS2000 sought to reduce Management Category from 5 down to 3 while instilling a common management philosophy through training that would allow for more managerial mobility. It also hoped to supply a steady pool of managerial replacements as the need arose. Following the Campbell government's restructuring, over 50 assistant deputy ministers were let go, with some regional managers now directly reporting to their deputy ministers. As well, a joint effort by the Treasury Board and Public Service began the Management Trainee Program to attract professional postgraduate students into the public service. In tandem with the La Relève initiative, it was seen as moderately successful.

=== Administrative Policy and Common Service Agencies ===
The PS2000 made several recommendations to Common Service Agencies about procurement that would be widely beneficial to those who worked in them. Procurement limits were increased from $500 to $2500 (up to $25,000 with certain safeguards) as well as introducing government credit cards to eliminate requisition forms. The Supply and Services Canada (SSC) department would also be modified by the recommendations made by the PS2000 with the SSC adopting an electronic order catalogue system (which would later be replaced by direct-from-supplier E-Commerce) as well as retooling the SSC to be purely procurement-based and not for-profit. As well, the task force recommended that the departmental requirement to use five common services (Crown Assets, Translation Bureau, Art Bank, Architectural & Engineering Services, and Central Travel) be made optional. All but Central Travel are now optional.

The administrative reform that was sought by the PS2000 would never fully come to fruition, with the dual fronts of two changes of government and constitutional negotiations sapping much of the government's attention away from any meaningful institutional changes.

=== Staff Relations ===
The task force on staff relations produced several important recommendations that would eventually make it into law in the Public Service Reform Act, 1992. Several changes that were considered positive by both union leaders and managers included changes to who was considered essential personnel (and therefore unable to strike), who could be excluded from joining unions due to their managerial position or interaction with confidential information, increasing the days of notice to bargain from 60 to 90 days, and increasing the scope of arbitration to cover all of collective bargaining. Several recommendations made that have yet to be implemented included consultation on the top two positions on the Public Service Staff Relations Board (appointments made by the Prime Minister), failure to introduce two-round bargaining, as well as neglecting to overhaul managerial capability to release employees for poor performance.

=== Resource Management and Budget Controls ===
The PS2000 achieved important changes to resource management and budgets that increased flexibility and efficiency. Single operating budgets were introduced which allowed for better efficiency and even delegating discretion of spending to front-line units. Year-end carry overs were also increased from 2% to 5% which reduced departmental stress to use up all funds before the end of the year. As well, departments were allowed to retain either part or all of the funds they generated as a way to encourage cost-recovery, although this is not the case for all departments so that budgets do not fluctuate on the basis of a departments ability to generate revenue. The PS2000 also proposed multi-year budgets and increasing the threshold for establishing votes, but these recommendations were never implemented.

=== Staffing ===
The PS2000 hoped to increase the flexibility managers had in recruitment and internal resourcing (see: Workforce Adaptiveness). Many managers were frustrated with the time it took to hire new recruits, and the PS2000 sought to address some of those issues. Temporary help agency assignment limits were increased from 8 to 20 weeks, along with implementing the acquisition of "casual" staff (can only be appointed for 3 months, and extendable another 3 months). This helped to bolster work-forces that needed additional manpower on a less than 6 months project, and was generally seen as a good move by managers. Additionally, employment equity programs and development programs were implemented across departments, along with increased use of technology for hiring purposes. Security clearances were made transferable across departments, and level 1 and 2 clearances were now granted in 30 days, down from 4 months. Promotion without competition was also authorized, with 11 circumstances outlined in the Public Service Reform Act, 1992 of when promotion without competition was permitted. As well, changes to a failing during a probationary period following a transfer to another department no longer resulted in an employee's termination, rather they were sent back to the department where they had been successful at. Finally, unsuccessful candidates who applied for jobs in the public service were now informed as to why another candidate had been selected over them which has seen a reduction in appeals.

=== Service to the Public ===
One of the major goals of PS2000 was to alter the way that the public service delivered services to the public. By 1991, 22 departments had adopted service-oriented mission statements with almost all departments switching over by the early 1990s. Considered a major achievement of the PS2000, other initiatives that encouraged this service-oriented culture included client consultation (through surveys, focus groups, etc.,) improvements to employee training in client services, utilizing TQM and one-stop shopping services to improve service availability and ethic while also working with other departments to jointly deliver service (sometimes with departments from provincial governments). As well, the federal government created the Citizen-Centred Service Network which involves officials from municipal, provincial, and federal levels of government and conducts research into citizen expectations of public service delivery as well as ways to effectively measure its service.

== La Relève and the Al-Mashat Affair, 1991 ==
On March 30, 1991, former Iraqi ambassador to the United States Mohammed Al-Mashat arrived in Canada as a landed immigrant after only inquiring a month before in Vienna. Due to the speedy processing time of his immigration documents, as well as his high-profile political association, his arrival was picked up by the media a week later after his arrival. The government issued a statement that Al-Mashat's quick admittance into Canada had been done so through an administrative error and without the involvement of any Ministers (although his security clearance from the Canadian Security Intelligence Services was granted in only a day, which was highly unusual). An internal investigation named the Department of External Affairs at fault, under the purview of Minister Joe Clark. In a move that ran contrary to ministerial responsibility, two public servants were named as the men at fault, Mr. Raymond Chretien and Mr. David Daubney. Clark denied any knowledge of Al-Mashat's arrival in Canada until it had been picked up by the media, while also regretting Al-Mashat's admission. Accusations that Clark had been shielded from his ministerial responsibility due to his political standing arose in the public service, which not only soured relations between public servants and their ministers but also did little to reinforce the tenets of PS2000 that public servants should be encouraged to work autonomously while those involved in the Al-Mashat affair were publicly shamed.

The good fiscal fortune that had accompanied the announcement of PS2000 would also not last long. The early 1990s saw the Canadian workforce suffer massive job losses due to a struggling world economy and inflationary excess from the 1970s and 1980s which would further exasperate the recession. As the recession continued, employment, corporate, and tax earnings decreased while social welfare spending and tax rates increased to shoulder the burden. Public resentment towards government grew as public opinion began to believe that the government had avoided the recession while citizens lost their jobs and were struggling financially. To show that measures were being taken in the public sector, finance ministers began making cuts for departments and agencies while reducing budgets and implementing a wage freeze that would last for 3 years. The massive layoffs, wage freezes, public resentment towards civil servants, and a failure to recruit new talent as veteran civil servants retired had created a "quiet crisis" in the public service, and in January 1997, the La Relève task force was launched to increase morale in the public service, increase the attractiveness of working for the government, and help fill out positions that had been left vacant by outgoing civil servants. With La Relève as the key focus for government reform in the late 1990s, PS2000 would be seriously hindered in further implementation with no further reports being issued about its progress.

== Criticisms ==
Although its implementation was mired by problems, there were still inherent criticisms of the focus of the PS2000. Chief among them was the failure of the PS2000 to improve human resource management and employee relations, which had been one of the major goals of the PS2000. Two round collective bargaining, meaningful promotions, and good union relations (which were important caveats of improving staff relations) were never realized. The PS2000 was also criticized for lacking a sense of urgency towards its implementation: this was attributed to the largely insiders' view to the problems affecting the public service. As well, the PS2000 was not realistic about the costs associated with reform, believing that the restructuring would free up manpower which in turn would increase productivity and recoup any lost costs. Furthermore, accountability mechanisms that should have been a central focus of the PS2000 to insulate employees and allow them more protection and freedom to innovate were never implemented properly, possibly leaving public servants to bear the brunt of criticism should they make a mistake (as seen in the Al-Mashat Affair). Another criticism was that the PS2000 often applied blanket level reforms to departments that may not have been served well by the changes suggested, or these changes were only partially implemented or not at all. Finally, the PS2000 was not ambitious enough about the role of information technology in the public service, and how it was changing the dynamic of delivering service to the public. With speedier response times expected because of email, the PS2000 should have focused on collaboration between departments and other levels of government to assist with increased levels of citizen engagement.
