= Public Service Alliance of Canada Building =

Trade union headquarters in Ottawa

Coordinates: 45.4162°N 75.6908°W

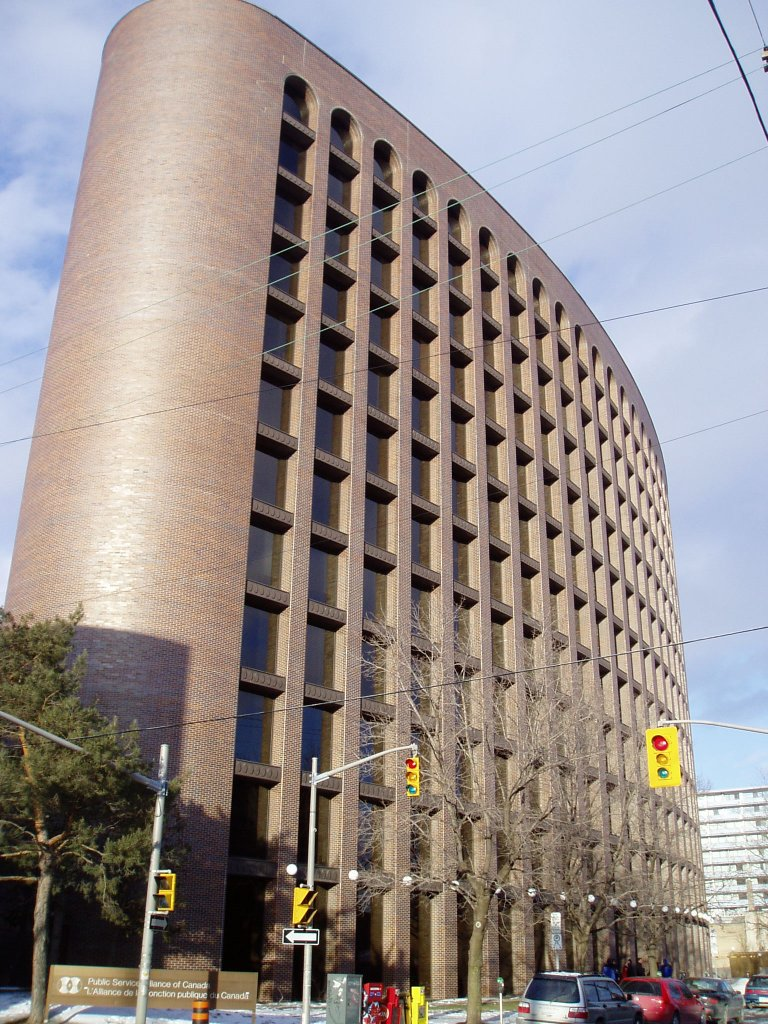

General information
- Architectural style: Modernist
- Location: 233 Gilmour Street, Ottawa, Ontario, Canada
- Opened: 21 December 1968
- Client: Public Service Alliance of Canada
- Owner: Public Service Alliance of Canada

Technical details
- Floor count: 12
- Floor area: 11,150 m^{2} (120,000 sq ft)

Design and construction
- Architect: Paul Schoeler
- Architecture firm: Schoeler & Heaton Architects
- Main contractor: Thomas Fuller Construction

The Public Service Alliance of Canada Building is a modernist elliptical office building in Ottawa, Ontario, constructed in 1968 as the national headquarters for the Public Service Alliance of Canada. Designed by Paul Schoeler of Schoeler & Heaton Architects, the 12-storey building is located at the intersection of Gilmour and Metcalfe. The building was a recipient of an Ontario Association of Architects Award. In 2000, the Royal Architectural Institute of Canada chose the building as one of the top 500 buildings produced in Canada during the last millennium.
