= John Gordon (union leader) =

John Gordon was the president of Public Service Alliance of Canada, a public service union in Canada. John Gordon first joined PSAC in 1974 as a tradesperson with Public Works Canada.

In the 1980s he was a board member and Secretary-Treasurer for the Labour Council of Toronto. He also was on the Anti-Racism committee and other committees in the Ontario Federation of Labour. From 1982 to 1999 he was the National President for the now defunct Union of Public Works Employees, which is now part of the Government Services Union.

From 2000 until 2006, he was the National Vice-President for PSAC. On May 6, 2006 he was elected President of PSAC at the union's fourteenth triennial national convention in Toronto. His mandate ended in 2012.
