= Embedded inspector =

Similar to an embedded journalist, an embedded inspector is paid by the regulator to observe regulated practices at the place of regulated activity. The inspector can work for his entire inspection career at the same regulated facility.

This term is commonly employed in modern British parlance, but the principles are global. Examples include:

- Office for Nuclear Regulation
- British Transport Police
