= Union of Taxation Employees =

The Union of Taxation Employees (UTE) represents more than 30,000 employees of Canada Revenue Agency. It is a component of Public Service Alliance of Canada. It is organized into 60 Locals, from St. John's to Victoria.

== History ==
In 1943, employees working for the then-Taxation Department first organized themselves into the Dominion Income Tax Staff Association.

In 1966, with the advent of free collective bargaining in the federal public service, the UTE joined the Public Service Alliance of Canada (PSAC) as the "Taxation Component".

In 1987, the UTE adopted its current name.
