= Public Service Alliance of Canada =

Trade union

- Abbreviation: PSAC
- Formation: 1966; 60 years ago
- Merger of: Civil Service Association of Canada; Civil Service Federation of Canada
- Type: Trade union
- Headquarters: PSAC Building, Ottawa, Ontario, Canada
- Location: Canada
- Members: 240,000 (2024)
- Official languages: English; French
- President: Sharon DeSousa
- Affiliations: Canadian Labour Congress; Public Services International
- Website: psacunion.ca

The Public Service Alliance of Canada (PSAC; French: Alliance de la Fonction publique du Canada, AFPC) a Canadian public sector labour union. It is the largest union in the Canadian federal public sector. PSAC members work in every province and territory, and also work abroad in embassies and consulates.

Many of PSAC's some 200,000 members work for the federal public service, crown corporations, or agencies as immigration officers, fisheries officers, food inspectors, customs officers, national defence civilian employees, and the like. However, an increasing number of PSAC members work in non-federal sectors: in women's shelters, universities, security agencies and casinos. In Northern Canada, PSAC represents most unionized workers employed in the Yukon, Nunavut and the Northwest Territories.

PSAC is headquartered in Ottawa with 23 regional offices across Canada. PSAC's Ottawa headquarters building, designed in 1968 by Paul Schoeler, is a notable example of modernist architecture in Ottawa.

== History ==
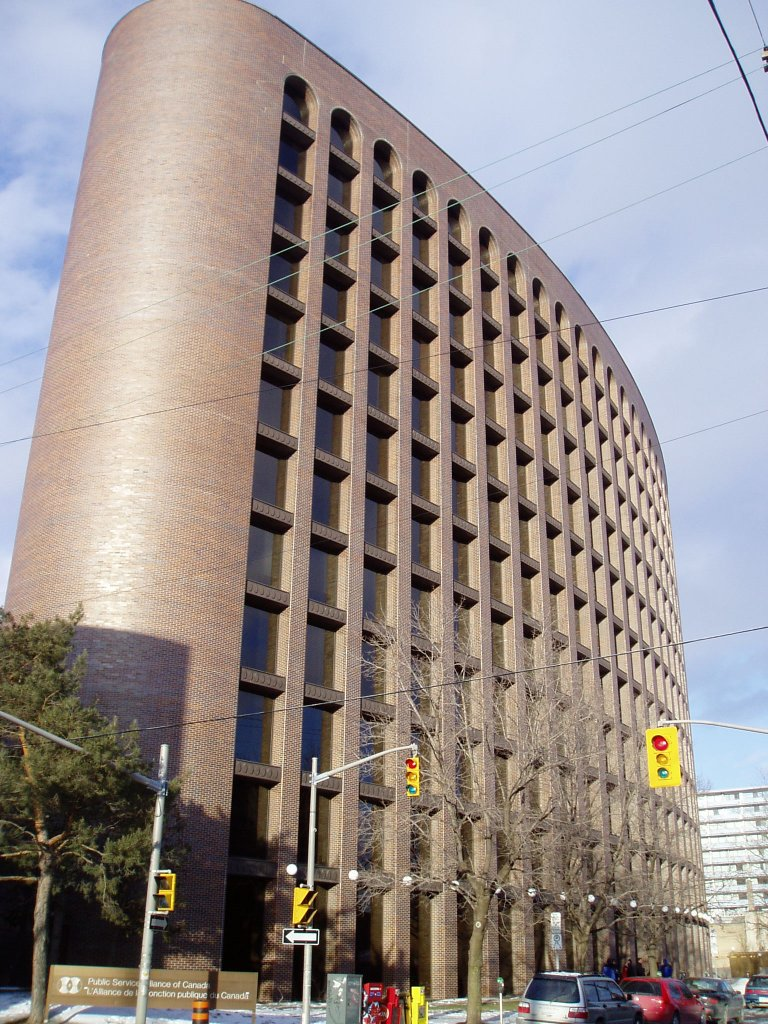
The Public Service Alliance of Canada Building in Ottawa

PSAC was formed when the Civil Service Association of Canada, led by Calbert Best, and Civil Service Federation of Canada, led by Claude Edwards, agreed to merge.

=== Bargaining ===
PSAC signed its first collective agreements with Treasury Board in 1968.

=== Strikes ===
PSAC's first strike came in November 1971 against Defence Construction Ltd. In 1980, the PSAC's large CR bargaining unit, made up largely of women clerical workers, went out. PSAC's 1991 general strike brought job security improvements. They held another strike in 2023.

=== Women in the union ===
Most founding convention delegates were men. In 1967, PSAC began organizing secretaries, stenographers and typists.

=== Equality rights ===
From 1981 onward, PSAC's Equal Opportunities Committee included all equity-seeking groups. In 1988, PSAC adopted a comprehensive human rights policy. Action committees for members with disabilities and racially visible members started in 1990. By 1999, the union started holding conferences for racially visible members, Aboriginal Peoples and workers with disabilities. In 2004, the first network of Aboriginal, Inuit and Metis members was formed to advance their rights within and beyond the union.

== Structure ==
=== Executive ===
The National President, the National Executive Vice-president and the seven Regional Executive Vice-presidents (REVPs) form the Alliance Executive Committee (AEC). The AEC is responsible for the day-to-day decisions of the union with respect to finances, overseeing campaigns, mobilizing the membership, advocating on behalf of the membership and advancing the union and its members' rights in the workplace. The AEC meets monthly and as needed. The current president of PSAC is Sharon DeSouza, elected in May 2024, working alongside National Executive Vice-president Alex Silas, elected the same year.

The current REVPs as of Summer 2026 are:

- Chris Di Liberatore, Regional Executive Vice-president, Atlantic (NB, NS, PEI, NL)
- Sébastien Paquette, Regional Executive Vice-president, Québec
- Ruth Lau-MacDonald, Regional Executive Vice-president, National Capital Region
- Craig Reynolds, Regional Executive Vice-president, Ontario
- Krysty Thomas, Regional Executive Vice-president, Prairies (AB, SK, MB)
- Jamey Mills, Regional Executive Vice-president, British Columbia
- Josée-Anne Spirito, Regional Executive Vice-president, North (NU, YT, NWT)

=== Components ===
- Agriculture Union (AU/PSAC) formerly the Canada Agriculture National Employees Association (CANEA) charter union
- Canada Employment and Immigration Union (CEIU/PSAC) charter union
- Customs and Immigration Union (CIU/PSAC) charter union
- Government Services Union (GSU/PSAC) joined after the merger in 1999 with the former Union of Public Works Employees and Supply and Services Union
- Nunavut Employees Union (NEU/PSAC) joined in 1999, previously members had belonged to the UNW
- Union of Canadian Transportation Employees (UCTE/PSAC) charter union – merged with the Natural Resources Union in 2017
- Union of Health and Environment Workers (UHEW/PSAC) formed by a merger of the Union of Environment Workers and the National Health Union in 2016
- Union of National Defence Employees (UNDE/PSAC) charter union
- Union of National Employees (NE/PSAC) (formerly the National Component) charter union
- Union of Northern Workers (UNW/PSAC) joined in 1970
- Union of Postal Communications Employees (UPCE/PSAC) joined in 1967, successor to the former Canadian Railway Mail Clerks Federation
- Union of Union of Safety and Justice Employees (USJE/PSAC)
- Union of Taxation Employees (UTE/PSAC) charter union
- Union of Veterans Employees (UVE/PSAC) charter union
- Yukon Employees Union (YEU/PSAC) joined in 1990

=== Directly Chartered Locals ===
Most PSAC local sections form part of a component. Each component represents workers in particular sections of the public service and is composed of various locals, each often representing a particular workplace. However, Directly Chartered Locals (DCL) also form part of the PSAC structure. Directly Chartered Locals are not part of a larger component, and instead report directly to PSAC central. Unlike most of PSAC's membership, Directly Chartered Locals are not part of the federal public service. For example, PSAC DCLs include Local 71250, representing security guards at the Bank of Canada, and the Syndicat des étudiant-e-s employé-es de l'UQAM (SÉTUE, Local 10721) which represents student workers at the Université du Québec à Montréal.

== List of presidents ==
- Sharon DeSousa (CEIU) 2024–Present
- Chris Aylward (UTE) 2018–2024
- Robyn Benson (UTE), 2012–2018
- John Gordon (GSU), 2006–2012
- Nycole Turmel (CEIU), 2000–2006
- Daryl Bean (PWU/GSU), 1985–2000
- Pierre Samson (CEIU), 1982–1985
- Andy Stewart (AU), 1976–1982
- Claude Edwards, Civil Service Federation of Canada (CSFC), 1966–1976
