= McGee (surname) =

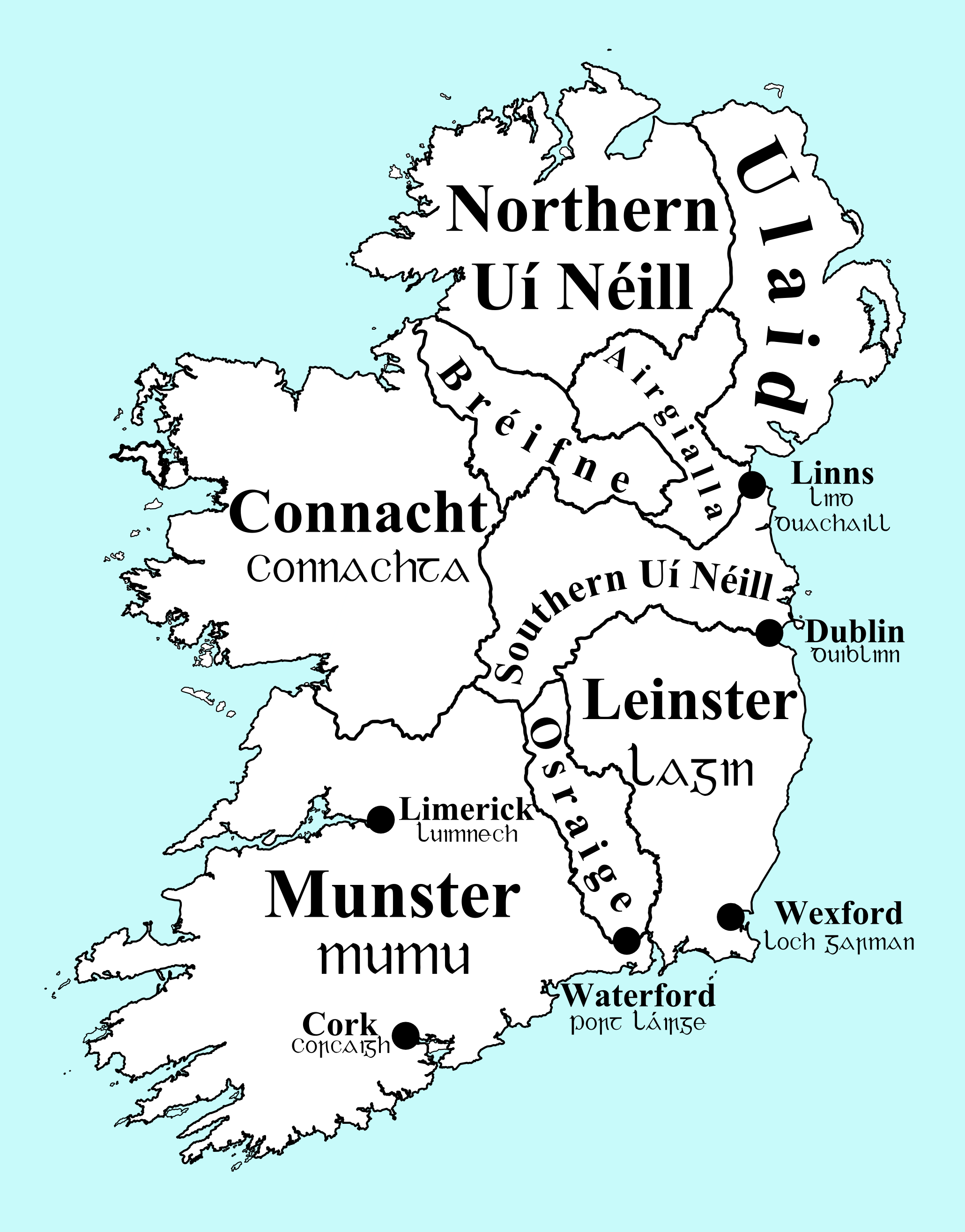
Map of Gaelic Ireland showing the territory of the Ulaid c. 900

McGee or McKee (Irish: Mac Aodha, meaning "son of Aodh") is an English language surname of Irish origin. The surname McGee was first found in along the border of counties Donegal and Tyrone (Tír Eoghain), the ancient territory of the O'Neills, now in the province of Ulster, central Northern Ireland, where they are thought to be descended from the Colla Uais. McGee was later a chieftain clan of the Ulaid, of which their territory corresponded to the Islandmagee peninsula in modern-day County Antrim, Northern Ireland. It is also anglicised as "McCoy".

== Notable people with this surname ==
- Alan McGee, British music industry mogul and musician
- Alice G. McGee (1869–1895) American lawyer and actress
- American McGee, video game designer
- Anita Newcomb McGee, doctor, founder of the Army Nurse Corps
- Arthur McGee (1933–2019), African American fashion designer
- Barry McGee, artist
- Bradley McGee, cyclist
- Carl McGee (born 1956), American football player
- Charles McGee (disambiguation), multiple people
- Chick McGee, radio personality
- Cory McGee, City councilman
- Court McGee (born 1984), American mixed martial arts fighter
- Debbie McGee, wife and assistant of magician Paul Daniels
- Easton McGee (born 1997), American baseball player
- Frank McGee (disambiguation), multiple people
- Gale W. McGee, American politician
- Haley McGee, Canadian actress
- Harold McGee, cookbook author
- Henry McGee (1929–2006), British actor
- J. Vernon McGee, Presbyterian minister
- Jack McGee (disambiguation), multiple people
- Jake McGee (born 1986), American baseball player
- James McGee (disambiguation), multiple people
- JaVale McGee (born 1988), American basketball player
- John McGee (disambiguation), multiple people
- Katharine McGee, American YA writer
- Kirk McGee (1899–1983), one of the McGee Brothers, an American country music duo
- Kirsty McGee (born 1972), British singer-songwriter
- Lewis McGee (soldier), Australian recipient of the Victoria Cross
- Linda M. McGee, American judge
- Luke McGee, English football
- Mary McGee (disambiguation), multiple people
  - Mary McGee, American motorsportswoman
  - Mary Rose McGee (1917–2004), American politician from New York
  - Mary McGee (boxer) (born 1986), boxer
- Max McGee (1932–2007), American football player
- Michael McGee (disambiguation), multiple people named Michael and Mike
- Pamela McGee (born 1962), American basketball player; mother of JaVale
- Peter McGee (active 2010s), Gaelic footballer
- Roger McGee (1922–2013), American film actor
- Sam McGee (1894–1975), one of the McGee Brothers, an American country music duo
- Sears McGee (1917–2006), American judge from Texas
- Seven McGee (born 2003), American football player
- Stephen McGee, American football player
- Suzy McGee Charnas, American novelist
- Terrence McGee, American football player
- Terry McGee, New Zealand-born Canadian geographer
- Tony McGee (defensive lineman) (born 1949)
- Tony McGee (tight end) (born 1971)
- Treneé McGee, American politician
- Thomas McGee (disambiguation), multiple people
- Thomas D'Arcy McGee, Canadian politician
- Tommy McGee (born 1979), Scottish rugby player
- Trina McGee-Davis, American actress
- Tyrus McGee (born 1991), American basketball player
- William McGee (disambiguation), multiple people
- Willie McGee (disambiguation), multiple people

== Fictional ==
- Fibber McGee, a main character in Fibber McGee and Molly
- Molly McGee, a main character in Fibber McGee and Molly
- Molly McGee, a main character in The Ghost and Molly McGee
  - Darryl McGee, Molly's younger brother in The Ghost and Molly McGee
  - Pete McGee, Molly and Darryl's father in The Ghost and Molly McGee
  - Sharon McGee, Molly and Darryl's mother in The Ghost and Molly McGee
- Timothy McGee, a character from NCIS
- Bobby McGee, title character in Kris Kristofferson's song Me and Bobby McGee
- Assy McGee, title character from the eponymous animated TV show.
- McGee, one of the main characters in the Canadian animated show Camp Lakebottom

== See also ==
- Magee (surname)
- McGhee, surname
- McGhie, surname
- Gee (surname)
