= Gee (surname) =

- Pronunciation: /ˈdʒiː, ɡiː/
- Language: English

Origin
- Language: Various
- Derivation: Various

Other names
- Variant forms: McGee; McGhee; Jee; Ji

Gee is a surname with various etymological origins. In English, it may be derived from Gee Cross, Stockport, Cheshire, which was named after a Gee family, or from the French personal name Guy or from the word geai meaning "jay bird" referring to someone who was a "bright chatterbox". In Celtic origins, Gee may derive from the Scots/Irish Gaelic personal name Gee or Mac Gee (an Anglicised form of Mac Aodh (pronounced "ee") meaning ‘son of Gee (Hugh)").

== People with the surname ==
- Adam Gee (producer) (born 1963), English interactive media and TV producer
- Adam Gee (golfer) (born 1980), English golfer
- Adam Gee (referee) (born 1985), Australian rugby league referee
- Alexander Gee, community activist and pastor in Madison, Wisconsin
- Allen Gee (1852–1939), British trade unionist and politician
- Alonzo Gee (born 1987) American basketball player
- Andrew Gee (born 1970), Australian rugby player
- Andrew Gee (born c. 1968), Australian politician from New South Wales
- Bobby Gee (born 1953), occasional spelling of singer Bobby G
- Brandon Gee (born 2000), Northumbrian musician and frontman of TENT (band)
- Cara Gee (born 1983), Canadian actress
- Catherine Gee (born 1967), British television presenter
- Constance Bumgarner Gee, American scholar, memoirist, and medical cannabis advocate
- Darron Gee (born 1962), English football player and manager
- David Gee (disambiguation), multiple people
- Delbert Gee, American judge from California
- Derek Gee (born 1997), Canadian racing cyclist
- Dillon Gee (born 1986), baseball player
- Dolly Gee (born 1959), American judge
- Dolly Gee (died 1966), American banker
- Donald Gee (1891-1966), English theologian
- Donald Gee (1937-2022), English actor
- Dustin Gee (1942–1986), English comedian
- Edward Pritchard Gee (1904–1968), British naturalist
- Eric Gee (1913–1989), British architectural historian
- Ethel Gee (1914–1984), British member of the Portland Spy Ring
- Franky Gee (1962–2005), frontman for the German pop group Captain Jack
- Gilbert Gee, American public health academic
- Gordon Gee (born 1944), American academic administrator
- Grant Gee (born 1964), British documentary and music video director
- Hector Gee (1909–1987), Australian rugby player
- Henry Gee (born 1962), British paleontologist
- Henry Gee (1858–1938), English churchman and academic
- Herbert Leslie Gee (1901–1977), English writer
- James Paul Gee (born 1948), researcher in psycholinguistics
- Jon Gee (born 1960), Australian politician
- Joshua Gee (1667–1730), British merchant, publicist and writer
- Keith Gee, Australian rugby player
- Kelly Gee, American public official
- Ken Gee (1916–1989), English rugby player
- Maggie Gee (disambiguation), multiple people, including:
  - Maggie Gee (born 1948), English novelist
  - Maggie Gee (1923–2013), American aviator
- Maurice Gee (1931–2025), New Zealand novelist
- Paris Gee (born 1994), Canadian soccer player
- Peter Gee (1932–2005), British-born artist
- Prunella Gee (born 1950), English actress
- Rich Gee (1894–1968), American baseball player
- Richard Gee (1933–2017), Australian judge
- Robert Gee (1876–1960), English recipient of the Victoria Cross
- Robin Gee, American dancer, choreographer, and film director
- Rosko Gee, bassist with bands such as Traffic and Can
- Rupert Jee (born 1956), business owner and television personality
- Spoonie Gee (born 1963), American rapper
- Sue Gee (born 1947), British novelist
- Tamara Gee (born 1972), American singer-songwriter
- Thomas Gee (1815–1898), Welsh preacher
- Tom Gee (1900–1984), American baseball player
- Valmai Gee (born 1971), Irish cricketer
- William Gee (1561–1611), English politician

== See also ==
- Rupert Jee, business owner and television personality
- McGee (surname)
- Ji (surname)
- Zhu (surname)
