= Charlie McGee =

Charlie McGee may refer to:

- Charlie McGee (Firestarter), character from science fiction-horror thriller novel by Stephen King
- Charles McGee (disambiguation)

== See also ==
- Charlie McGeever
- Charles McKee
