= Louise Kenny =

British physician

Louise Kenny CBE
- Born: 1970 (age 55–56); Liverpool
- Education: University of Liverpool
- Scientific career
- Workplaces: University of Liverpool
- Thesis: The role of endothelium-derived hyperpolarizing factor in normal and compromised pregnancies (2003)

Louise Clare Kenny (born 1970) is a British physician who is a Professor of Fetal and Maternal Health and Pro-Vice-Chancellor at the University of Liverpool. She was appointed a Commander of the Order of the British Empire in the 2022 New Year Honours.

== Early life and education ==
Kenny was born and raised in Liverpool. Her grandparents were Irish immigrants who moved to Liverpool during the Great Depression. Her mother was born during the Liverpool Blitz, an attack that killed Kenny's great aunt and her children. Kenny has said that she always wanted to become a doctor. As a teenager, she worked in a café in the Great Homer Street market. She studied medicine at the University of Liverpool, where she initially intended to become a cardiologist. She changed her mind the moment she saw a baby being born. After training as a senior house officer, she started a doctoral research programme at the University of Nottingham funded by the Medical Research Council and WellBeing for Women.

== Career ==
In 2006, Kenny was appointed a Consultant Obstetrician and Gynaecologist at Cork University Hospital. She specialised in hypertensive disease of pregnancy.

In 2013, Kenny founded the Science Foundation Ireland Irish Centre for Fetal and Neonatal Translational Research (INFANT), which is based at the University College Cork. The centre focusses on improving health outcome for mothers and babies around the world. INFANT is involved with various studies into issues that impact pregnant women, including pre-eclampsia, preterm birth and intrauterine growth restriction. At INFANT, Kenny focused on the identification of biomarkers that may indicate women are at risk of pre-eclampsia. Kenny was involved with overturning the Irish ban on abortion.

In 2017, Kenny moved to the University of Liverpool, where she was made Pro Vice Chancellor.. At Liverpool, Kenny leads a Wellcome-funded research programme that looks to improve the health of children who grow up in Liverpool City. Kenny is currently Chair of the Northern Health Science Alliance and Chief Executive Officer of Liverpool Health Partners.

== Awards and honours ==
- 2015 Science Foundation Ireland Researcher of the Year
- 2015 Tatler Magazine Woman of the Year
- 2017 Guaranteed Irish Science Hero

Kenny was appointed Commander of the Order of the British Empire (CBE) in the 2022 New Year Honours for services to research in the NHS. Together with her husband, Dr Matthew Hewitt, also a Gynaecologist, Kenny was conferred with Honorary Fellowship of the Royal College of Physicians of Ireland in March 2026. She was elected a Fellow of the Academy of Medical Sciences in June 2026.

== Selected publications ==
- Mark A Brown; Laura A Magee; Louise C Kenny; et al. (1 July 2018). "Hypertensive Disorders of Pregnancy: ISSHP Classification, Diagnosis, and Management Recommendations for International Practice". Hypertension. 72 (1): 24–43. doi:10.1161/hypertensionaha.117.10803. ISSN 0194-911X. PMID 29899139. Wikidata Q89093946.
- Ali S Khashan; Kathryn M. Abel; Roseanne McNamee; Marianne G Pedersen; Roger T. Webb; Philip Baker; Louise Kenny; Preben Bo Mortensen (1 February 2008). "Higher risk of offspring schizophrenia following antenatal maternal exposure to severe adverse life events". JAMA Psychiatry. 65 (2): 146–152. doi:10.1001/archgenpsychiatry.2007.20. ISSN 2168-622X. PMID 18250252. Wikidata Q50873408.
- Louise Kenny; David I Broadhurst; Warwick Dunn; et al. (1 October 2010). "Robust early pregnancy prediction of later preeclampsia using metabolomic biomarkers". Hypertension. 56 (4): 741–749. doi:10.1161/hypertensionaha.110.157297. ISSN 0194-911X. PMID 20837882. Wikidata Q46329980.
