= Thomas Gee (disambiguation) =

Thomas Gee (1815–1898) was a Welsh Nonconformist preacher.

Thomas Gee may also refer to:

- Thomas Gibbs Gee (1925–1994), United States circuit judge
- Tom Gee (Thomas Henry Gee Jr., 1900–1984), African-American baseball catcher in the Negro leagues
- Thomas Gee, name of the founder of Gwasg Gee publishing firm, and his more famous son who later took over the firm

== See also ==
- Thomas McGee (disambiguation)
