= William McGee =

William McGee may refer to:

- William J. McGee, American consumer advocate
- William C. McGee (born 1936), American politician, Republican member of the North Carolina General Assembly
- William D. McGee (1923–1945), American soldier and Medal of Honor recipient
- William John McGee (1853–1912), American geologist and anthropologist
- William Sears McGee (1917–2006), Justice of the Supreme Court of Texas
- William McGhee (1930–2007), African-American actor (also known as Bill McGee)
- Bill McGee (1909–1987), baseball player
- Bill McGee (Manitoba politician)
- Billy McGee (footballer) (1878–1939), Australian rules footballer

== See also ==
- Willie McGee (disambiguation)
- William Magee (disambiguation)
