= Magee (surname) =

Magee is an Irish and Scottish surname derived from the Irish surnames Mag Aodha and O’Maolgaoithe. It is uncommon as a given name. Notable people with the surname include:

- Abbie Magee (born 2000), Northern Irish football player
- Adrian Magee (born 1996), American football player
- Amos Magee (born 1971), American soccer player, coach, and front office
- Dean Magee (born 1968), Prominent esoteric freemason and veteran
- Andrew Magee (born 1962), American golfer, only player in PGA history to have a hole-in-1 on a par 4
- Audrey Magee, Irish novelist
- Barry Magee (born 1934), New Zealand marathon runner
- Bryan Magee (1930–2019), British politician, writer and broadcaster
- Christopher Magee (politician) (1848–1901), American political boss in Pittsburgh, Pennsylvania
- Christopher Magee (fighter pilot) (1917–1995), US Marine Corps aviator
- Clare Magee (1899–1969), American politician from Missouri
- David Magee (born 1962), American screenwriter
- Eamonn Magee (born 1971), Irish boxer, brother of Noel and Terry
- Emily Magee (born 1965), American soprano
- Fletcher Magee (born 1996), American basketball player
- Fintan Magee (born 1985), Australian artist
- Gwendolyn Ann Magee (1943–2011), African-American fiber artist
- James McDevitt Magee (1877–1949), American politician from Pennsylvania
- Jerry Magee (1928–2019), American journalist
- Jimmy Magee (1935–2017), Irish broadcaster
- John Alexander Magee (1827–1903), American politician from Pennsylvania
- John Gillespie Magee Jr. (1922–1941), poet and aviator
- John W. Magee (1848–?), American Medal of Honor recipient
- John Magee (disambiguation), multiple people
- Jordan Magee (born 2001), American football player
- Kevin Magee (motorcycle racer) (born 1962), Australian motorcycle rider
- Kevin Magee (basketball) (1959–2003), American basketball player
- Laura Magee, Canadian physician
- Michael Magee (writer) (born 1993), Northern Irish novelist
- Mike Magee (journalist) (born 1949), British journalist
- Mike Magee (soccer) (born 1984), American soccer player
- Noel Magee (born 1965), Irish boxer, brother of Eamonn and Terry
- Patrick Magee (Irish republican) (born 1951), Provisional Irish Republican Army member
- Paul Magee (born 1948), Provisional Irish Republican Army member
- Ruchell Magee (born 1939), US convict
- Rusty Magee (1955–2003), American composer, lyricist, actor and comedian
- Ryan Magee, YouTube personality
- Sherry Magee (1884–1929), American baseball player

((Terence Magee)) (born 1942), British comics editor and writer

- Terrence Magee (born 1993), American football player
- Terry Magee (born 1971), Irish boxer, brother of Noel and Eamonn
- Tom Magee (born 1958), Canadian powerlifter, world's strongest man competitor and wrestler
- Tommy Magee (1899–1974), English football player
- Walter W. Magee (1862–1927), American politician from New York
- William A. Magee (1873–1938), American politician from Pennsylvania

== See also ==
- McGee (surname)
