= Hagee =

Hagee is a surname. Notable people with the surname include:

- Michael Hagee (born 1944), 33rd Commandant of the United States Marine Corps
- John Hagee (born 1940), American pastor and televangelist

== See also ==
- Hagen (surname)
- Hager
- Magee (surname)
