= James McGee =

James McGee may refer to:

- James Dwyer McGee (1903-1987), Australian physicist, one of the main inventors of the television camera in 1932, at EMI in West London
- James McGee (author) (born 1950), English novelist
- James McGee (Irish politician) (died 1956), Irish senator
- James McGee (tennis) (born 1987), Irish Davis Cup team member and professional tour player
- James A. McGee (1879–1904), Canadian football and ice hockey player
- James D. McGee (born 1949), American diplomat
- James H. McGee (1918–2006), American politician and mayor of Dayton, Ohio
- Jimmy McGee (1923–1998), Irish basketball player

== See also ==
- James Magee (disambiguation)
- James McGhee (disambiguation)
