= Meade F. Griffin =

American judge (1894–1974)

Meade Felix Griffin (March 17, 1894 – June 3, 1974) was a justice of the Supreme Court of Texas from April 1, 1949 to December 31, 1968.

He died on June 3, 1974 in Austin, Texas at age 77.

Political offices
Preceded by A. J. Folley	Justice of the Texas Supreme Court; 1949–1968	Succeeded by Sears McGee
