= Joseph-Olivier Coté =

Clerk of the Privy Council
- In office January 13, 1880 – April 24, 1882
- Preceded by: William Alfred Himsworth
- Succeeded by: John Joseph McGee

Personal details
- Born: April 8, 1820 Quebec City, Lower Canada
- Died: April 24, 1882 (aged 62) Ottawa, Ontario

Joseph-Olivier Coté (April 8, 1820 – April 24, 1882) was a Canadian notary, public servant, and Clerk of the Privy Council from 1880 to 1882.

Born in Quebec City, Lower Canada, the son of Olivier Côté and Louise-Charlotte Sasseville. Coté was educated at the Séminaire de Québec from 1831 to 1835.

He then studied law and was admitted as a notary in 1841. From 1842 to 1843, he was the deputy registrar of Berthier County. In 1845, he was appointed a clerk in the Executive Council Office of the Province of Canada.

In 1872, he was appointed deputy clerk of the Privy Council Office of the dominion. In 1880, he was appointed Clerk of the Privy Council and served until his death in 1882.
