= Michael A. Dornheim Award =

The Michael A. Dornheim Award is presented in honor of the late Michael Dornheim, a longtime reporter and editor at Aviation Week & Space Technology magazine.

The award is presented annually as part of the National Press Club's journalism awards, which recognizes and honors professional journalists for their outstanding work for the public, either independently or as employees of editorially-independent news and media entities. The recipient must be a working journalist writing about aerospace, defense, the airline industry, or aerospace science and engineering. Entrants may enter up to 6 examples of work, and the winner receives a $1,000 prize.

== Winners ==
Michael A. Dornheim Award Winners, 2008 to present
Year of award	Author	Publication	-
2026	Joel Schectman & Arun Viswanatha	Wall Street Journal	For "The Pentagon Disinformation That Fueled America's UFO Mythology," yearlong investigation covering seven decades of UFO reports concluded the U.S. military fabricated evidence of alien technology and allowed rumors to fester to cover up real secret-weapons programs. The reporters got the Pentagon to respond and received letters from even the strongest UFO believers, saying the story “opened their eyes to the truth.”
2025	Tony Bartelme	Post and Courier	For "41 Seconds," the first account by a decorated Marine pilot who ejected from his F-35B Lightning II after a cascade of failures that left the pilot flying blind at low altitude in severe weather. While the commandant of the Marines later blamed the pilot, this series prompted Senator Tommy Tuberville of Alabama to criticize the commandant in a congressional hearing.
2024	Emily Steele, Sydney Ember, & Mike Baker	The New York Times	For their insider look at issues facing air traffic controllers in their investigative piece, “Flight Risks.”
2023	Craig Whitlock & Nate Jones	Washington Post	For the three part series, “Foreign Servants: Retired U.S. Generals, Admirals Take Top Jobs With Saudi Crown Prince” that revealed more than 500 retired U.S. military personnel — including scores of generals and admirals — have taken lucrative jobs since 2015 working for foreign governments, mostly in countries known for human rights abuses and political repression.
2022	Christopher Freeze	Air Line Pilot magazine	For his 8-part series, "ALPA at 90," which highlighted aviation safety technologies or topics that the labor union championed.
2021	Kiera Feldman	Los Angeles Times	For a year-long investigation revealing how mechanical problems on airplanes can cause heated jet engine oil to leak into the air supply — a phenomenon known as “fume events” — which could sicken passengers and crew members.
2020	Valerie Insinna	Defense News	For the in-depth feature series, “The Hidden Troubles of the F-35.”
2019	Mark Harris	Freelance	For research, investigative reporting and writing of the aerospace industry, particularly in the satellite sector.
2018	John Donnelly	CQ Roll Call	For stories on F-35 ejections and military accidents that exemplify solid and uncompromised investigative journalism.
2017	Elan Head	Vertical magazine	For stories that raised significant safety concerns about helicopters.
2016	W.J. Hennigan	Los Angeles Times	For a variety of strong stories on defense topics - from pilots flying drones to flying in a U-2 spy plane.
2015	Thomas Frank	USA Today	For “Unfit for Flight,” a five-part series that revealed the hidden dangers of private aviation.
2014	Sara Sorcher	National Journal	For stories that explored defense procurement, civil applications of unmanned aerial vehicles, federal budgeting and congressional oversight.
2013	Bart Jansen	USA Today	For his stories on air travel
2012	Nathan Hodge	Wall Street Journal	For coverage of U.S. defense policy.
2011	Christopher Castelli	"Inside The Pentagon" (Note: "Inside the Pentagon" is Inside Washington Publishers' flagship defense publication.)	For his reporting on the Defense Department's failure to put required cockpit voice recorders on V-22 Ospreys.
2010	Andy Pasztor & Susan Carey	Wall Street Journal	For their coverage of the crash of a Colgan Air turboprop near Buffalo, New York.
2009	Sally Adee	IEEE Spectrum magazine	For the story "The Hunt for the Kill Switch"
2008	William J. McGee	Multiple	For his combined works in Consumer Reports; Condé Nast Traveler; Money Magazine; USA Today

== Namesake ==
Michael A. Dornheim (1954–2006) was a journalist at Aviation Week for more than two decades. After a dinner with friends on June 3, 2006, he drove away from the restaurant, suggesting he would take "the back way." Nine days later, law enforcement officials found Dornheim's car had run off the road and descended 350 feet. Landing inverted, Dornheim was found deceased at the scene.

Dornheim was awarded two more writing awards posthumously.
