= Maggie Gee =

Maggie Gee may refer to:

- Maggie Gee (novelist) (born 1948), English novelist
- Maggie Gee (pilot) (1923–2013), American aviator
