= Jack McGee =

Jack McGee may refer to:

- Jack McGee (actor) (born 1949), American television and film actor
- Jack McGee (aviator) (1885–1918), American aviator
- Jack McGee (Canadian football) (1932–2009), Canadian football player and car dealership owner

== See also ==
- John McGee (disambiguation)
