= Thomas D'Arcy McGee Building =

Office building in Ottawa, Canada

- Édifice Thomas D'Arcy McGee
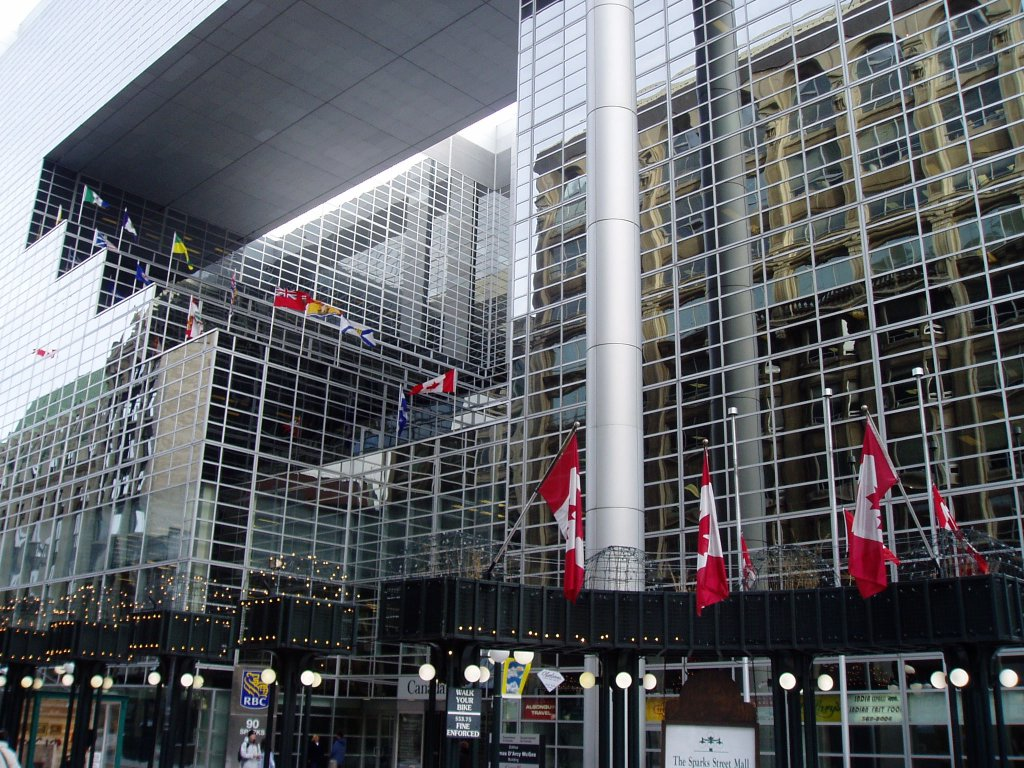
- Interactive map of the Thomas D'Arcy McGee Building area
- Former names: Royal Bank Centre (1981-2002)

General information
- Status: Completed
- Location: 90 Sparks Street, Ottawa, Ontario, Canada
- Coordinates: 45.422742°N 75.696584°W
- Current tenants: Government of Canada, Royal Bank of Canada
- Named for: Thomas D'Arcy McGee
- Opened: 1981
- Owner: Larco Investments

Design and construction
- Architecture firm: David Boulva Cleve

The Thomas D'Arcy McGee Building, at 90 Sparks Street, is an office building in Ottawa, Ontario, Canada. It is located on the south side of Sparks Street, east of Metcalfe. The building was opened in 1981 with the Royal Bank of Canada as its main occupant and accordingly it was named the Royal Bank Centre. As with many Ottawa office buildings it also became home to a number of federal government offices. In March 2001, the building was purchased by the federal government for 66 million dollars. The next year, it was renamed after Father of Confederation Thomas D'Arcy McGee, who was assassinated in 1868 near the site of the building. It is still RBC's Ottawa headquarters and the bank's logo remains on the structure.

On October 31, 2007, the Building was sold to Larco Investments Limited on a leaseback arrangement good for 25 years.

The bottom two storeys contain a shopping complex.

The site was once occupied by a row of stores including hat maker and retailer R.J. Devlin Limited, which later operated as Morgan's.
