= George Bramwell Evens =

British radio broadcaster, minister and writer

Reverend George Bramwell Evens
- Born: 15 February 1884; Hull, England
- Died: 20 November 1943 (aged 59); Wilmslow, Cheshire, England
- Education: Epworth College, Rhyl; Queens College, Taunton
- Occupations: Methodist preacher; Radio presenter; Author
- Known for: Out With Romany
- Spouse: Eunice Evens
- Children: 2, including Romany June Evens

The Rev. George Bramwell Evens (15 February 1884 – 20 November 1943) was, under the pseudonym Romany (and sometimes The Tramp), a British radio broadcaster and writer on countryside and natural history matters – quite possibly the first to broadcast on such issues. He was also a Minister of the Methodist Church.

== Biography ==
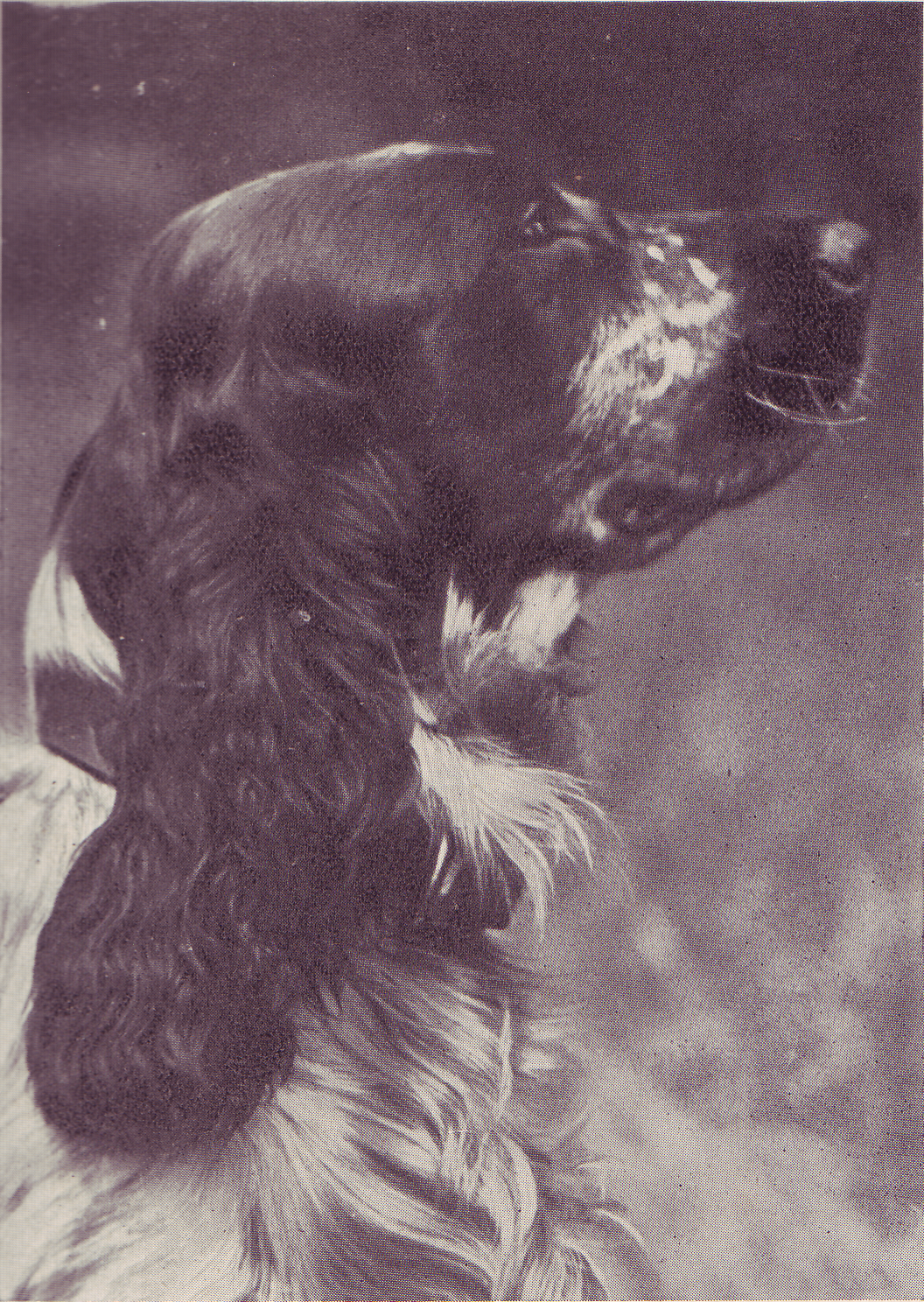
Evens' photograph of Raq, from the frontispiece of Out With Romany Again

Evens' mother was Romani, born in a vardo (Romany wagon). His father was Salvation Army Lieutenant George Evens, a native of Plymouth. He was born at 3 Argyll Street, Anlaby Road, Hull, England and educated at Epworth College, Rhyl, as boarder, then at Queens College, Taunton. He married Eunice, the daughter of The Reverend Owen Thomas on 1 August 1911.

He is most famous for his Out with the Romany radio programmes (later Out with Romany), which commenced in 1933 on the BBC's Children's Hour, describing travels in his own vardo (purchased in 1921, at Brough Hill Fair, for £75), with Comma the horse, his English Cocker Spaniel Raq, and his young friends Muriel and Doris. Although the programmes were all pre-scripted and performed entirely in the studio, the impression given was of Romany and his friends going for a walk in the countryside and spontaneously discussing the plants and animals they came across. Raphael Samuel saw the programme as instrumental in making the countryside desirable for a generation of listeners. Simon Barnes has paid tribute to how his father (radio) and himself (books) were drawn to natural history by Romany: "I longed to walk through the country with the all-knowing, all-seeing Romany".

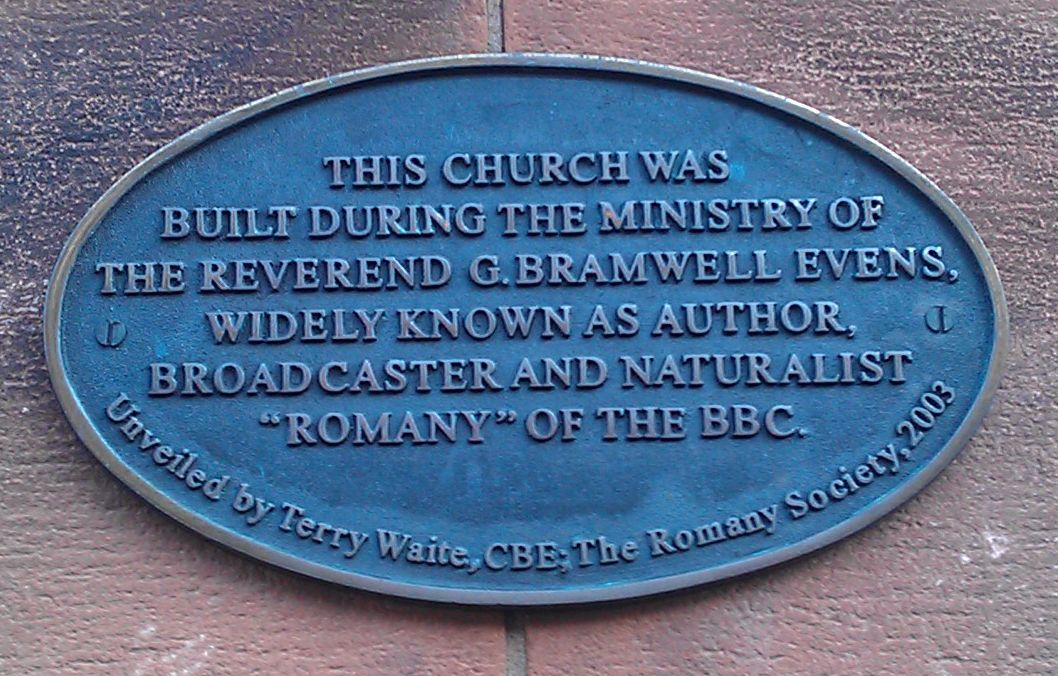
Plaque in Carlisle

As a Methodist minister, Evens' ministries included Goole; the Methodist Central Hall, Carlisle (1914–1926); Huddersfield (1926–1929); and the King Cross Methodist Chapel, Halifax (1929–1939), after which ill health forced him to give up the ministry. He retired to Wilmslow, where he died, leaving his wife, son Glyn and daughter, Romany June. He lived at Number 1, Parkway, Wilmslow and he died in the house following feeling unwell building a Cumbrian stone rockery in the garden.

His ashes were scattered, at his request, at Old Parks Farm, Glassonby, Cumbria, which he had enjoyed visiting over a 22-year period: in 2001, a memorial to him was erected there by The Romany Society.

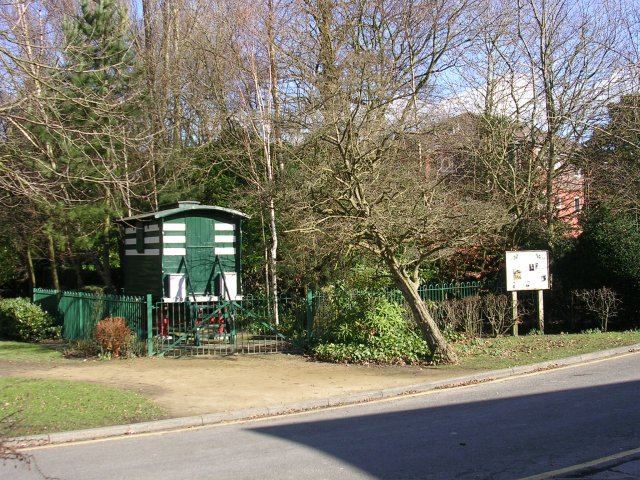
The vardo in Wilmslow in 2006

The vardo was donated, unconditionally, by his widow, to the forerunners of Cheshire East Borough Council (CEBC). For many years it was displayed by CEBC, outdoors, in Wilmslow. In late 2012, having deteriorated badly, it was restored and moved to Bradford Industrial Museum, to be displayed indoors.

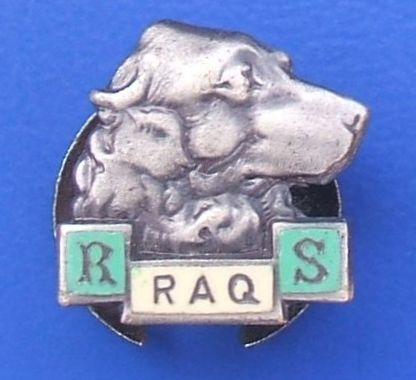
A 1950s Romany Society badge, depicting Raq

The Romany Society, originally formed in 1943, disbanded in 1965, and re-founded in 1996, celebrates his life and work, with regular newsletters and an annual magazine. Its patron is Terry Waite.

The BBC radio programmes were all broadcast live, and only one recording survives – dated October 1943, just a month before his death. It was released on CD in 2006.

== Bibliography ==
The books were analysed, from a collector's point of view, in the January 2002 edition of Book and Magazine Collector magazine.

=== Original Romany Books ===
(Credited to G. Bramwell Evens)

- A Romany in the Fields (Epworth Press, 1929)
- A Romany and Raq (Epworth Press, 1930)
- A Romany in the Country (Epworth Press, 1932)
- A Romany on the Trail (Epworth Press, 1934; illustrations by Reg Gammon)
- Out with Romany (University of London Press (UoL), 1937; illustrations by Gammon and photographs by Romany)
- Out with Romany Again (UoL, 1938; line drawings by Gammon and photographs by Romany)
- Out with Romany Once More (UoL, 1940; illustrations by Gammon)
- Out with Romany by the Sea (UoL, 1941; illustrations by Gammon and photographs by Romany)
- Out with Romany by Meadow and Stream (UoL, 1942; illustrations by Gammon)
- Out With Romany by Moor and Dale (UoL, 1944; illustrations by Gammon)
- Walks with Romany (E.J. Arnold & Son, undated)

=== The Romany Readers ===
Published by the University of London Press in 1951.

1. Hotchi the Hedgehog
2. Smut the Hare
3. Flash the Fox
4. Spook the Barn-owl
5. Pete and Prue the Partridges
6. Nick the Weasel
7. Billy the Squirrel
8. Sleek the Otter

=== By Romany's son ===
Written by Romany's son, Glyn K. Evens.

- Romany, Muriel & Doris (told by Raq) (UoL; illustrations by Gammon)
- Romany Turns Detective
- Romany on the Farm
- Romany's Caravan Returns

=== By Romany's wife ===
Written by Romany's wife, Eunice Evens.

- Through the Years with Romany (UoL, 1946)

=== By Romany's friend ===
Written by Romany's friend, H.L. Gee.

- The Spirit of Romany (St. Hugh's Press, 1949)

=== A new Romany Book ===
Written by Phil Shelley, Publications Officer for the Romany Society, and illustrated by Ray Hollands.

- Romany in the Lanes (Lamorna Publications, 2007)

== Biography ==
- Romany Returns, Guy Loveridge (includes reprints of some stories)

== See also ==
- Norman Ellison aka Nomad the Naturalist.
