= Oscar Mauzy =

American politician (1926–2000)

Justice of the Supreme Court of Texas
- In office January 3, 1987 – December 31, 1992
- Preceded by: Sears McGee
- Succeeded by: Craig T. Enoch

Member of the Texas Senate from the 23rd district
- In office January 10, 1967 – January 3, 1987
- Preceded by: Jack Hightower
- Succeeded by: Eddie Bernice Johnson

Personal details
- Born: November 9, 1926 Houston, Texas, U.S.
- Died: October 10, 2000 (aged 73) Austin, Texas, U.S.
- Party: Democratic

Oscar Holcolmbe Mauzy (November 9, 1926 – October 10, 2000) was an American politician who served in the Texas Senate from the 23rd district from 1967 to 1987 and as a justice of the Supreme Court of Texas from January 3, 1987 to December 31, 1992.

He died of lung cancer on October 10, 2000, in Austin, Texas at age 73.
