= Norman Ellison =

English radio presenter and author

Norman F. Ellison
- Born: 1893
- Died: 1976 (aged 82–83)
- Presenting career
- Show: Children's Hour
- Station: Home Service
- Network: BBC
- Country: United Kingdom

Norman F. Ellison (1893–1976) was an English radio presenter and author who made radio programmes about nature and the countryside for the BBC's Children's Hour, under the pseudonym Nomad the Naturalist, and wrote on the same subjects both as Nomad and in his own name.

Born in Liverpool in 1893, he signed up as a private in the 1/6thn (Liverpool Rifles) Battalion, King's Liverpool Regiment, at the outbreak of World War I, and served in the trenches in Belgium. He saw action on The Somme and at Flanders but was discharged in 1917 suffering from trench foot. His war diaries were published in 1997.

In later life, he lived at West Kirby, on the Wirral Peninsula, Cheshire. He and Eric Hosking would watch birds together at Hilbre Island. Six of his books were illustrated by his friend Charles Tunnicliffe.

== Bibliography ==
- Down Nature's Byways, University of London Press, 1938.
- Out of Doors with Nomad (illustrated by Tunnicliffe), University of London Press, 1947.
- Our British birds and beasts (photographs by Hosking, drawings by Alfed K. Wiffen), Open Air Books, 1947
  - Republished by Countrygoer Books, 1953
- Wild Life in Britain, Open Air Books
- Roving with Nomad (illustrated by Tunnicliffe), University of London Press, 1949.
- Adventuring with Nomad (illustrated by Tunnicliffe), University of London Press, 1950.
- Northwards with Nomad (illustrated by Tunnicliffe), University of London Press, 1951.
- Over the Hills with Nomad (illustrated by Tunnicliffe), University of London Press.
- Wandering with Nomad (illustrated by Tunnicliffe), University of London Press.
- A check list of the fauna of Lancashire and Cheshire: Mammalia, Reptilia, Amphibia, 1959
- The Wirral Peninsula, Hale, 1970 ISBN 0-7091-1660-8
- Remembrances of Hell, the Great War diary of naturalist, writer and broadcaster Norman F. Ellison – 'Nomad' of the BBC, edited by David R. Lewis, Airlife, 1997 ISBN 978-1-85310-896-9

== See also ==
- George Bramwell Evens aka Romany.
