= David Gee =

David Gee may refer to:

- David Gee (artist) (1793–1872), English painter
- David Gee (forger) (1929–2013), Australian coin forger
- David Gee (sheriff), sheriff of Hillsborough County, Florida
- David Gee (soccer), soccer coach and administrator
- David J. Gee (author), CIO, CISO, Board Advisor, Sydney
- David G. Gee (born 1937), English-born geologist working in Sweden
