= A. J. Folley =

American judge (1896–1981)

Alfred Jennings Folley (November 28, 1896 – May 10, 1981), often called "A.J." or "Jack" Folley, was a justice of the Supreme Court of Texas from September 21, 1945, to April 1, 1949.

Born in Limestone County, Texas and raised on a farm in the vicinity of Thornton, Texas, Folley attended high school in Mart, Texas. When President Woodrow Wilson instituted a draft for soldiers to serve in World War I, Folley registered in June 1918, and was assigned to Camp Travis, near San Antonio, where Folley remained in a unit responsible for laundry and clothing repair until the war ended the following year. After the war, he returned to his education, receiving a B.A. from Baylor University in 1921, followed by an LL.B. from the same institution in 1925. While in law school, he also taught history at Baylor.

He entered private practice, and was the district attorney for Floydada, Texas from 1929 to 1934, when he was elected district judge for the 106th Judicial District of Texas. He served in that capacity until his appointment to the Seventh Court of Civil Appeals in Amarillo in 1937, and in 1943 was appointed by the Supreme Court to serve on the court's Commission of Appeals. In 1945, Texas voters approved an amendment to the state constitution which expanded the state's supreme court from three members to nine, transferring the Commissioners to the Court by operation of law.

Folley remained on the court until his resignation in April 1949, authoring 63 opinions in his four-and-a-half year tenure. He then resumed the practice of law with various firms, and was the 20th President of the State Bar of Texas from 1959 to 1960.

Political offices
| Preceded by Newly created seat | Justice of the Texas Supreme Court; 1945–1949 | Succeeded by Meade F. Griffin |
