= William Magee =

William Magee may refer to:

- William Magee (archbishop of Dublin) (1766–1831), Anglican Archbishop of Dublin
- William Magee (Medal of Honor), U.S. Army drummer and a Medal of Honor recipient for his role in the American Civil War
- William Magee (politician) (1939–2020), American politician, member of the New York State Assembly, 1991–2018
- William Connor Magee (1821–1891), Irish Anglican clergyman, Archbishop of York, 1891
- William A. Magee (1873–1938), American politician, mayor of Pittsburgh, 1909–1914, and 1922–1926
- William Kirkpatrick Magee (1868–1961), Irish man of letters who adopted the pen-name of "John Eglinton"
- Bill Magee (1875–?), American baseball pitcher for the 1898 Louisville Colonels

== See also ==
- William McGee (disambiguation)
