= Mary McGee (disambiguation) =

Mary McGee (1936–2024) was an American motorsport racing pioneer.

Mary McGee may also refer to:

- Mary McGee (boxer) (born 1986), American boxer, IBF women's light welterweight champion
- Mary Rose McGee (1917–2004; née Grasher), American politician
- May McGee (1944–2025), Irishwoman plaintiff in 1973 McGee v The Attorney General that conferred family planning to married couples
- Mary McGee Davenport (née McGee), cofounder of American restaurant chain Krystal
- Caitlin Mary McGee, Youth MP for Auckland Central in the 2000 New Zealand Youth Parliament
- Mary McGee, a fictional character from the 1948 U.S. film Speed to Spare
