= John McGee =

John McGee may refer to:

- John McGee (greyhound trainer), seven times UK champion trainer
- John McGee (politician) (born 1973), American state legislator in the Idaho Senate
- John B. McGee, American state legislator in the Nevada Assembly between 1874 and 1876
- John Edward McGee, Jr., professionally known as John Edward (born 1969), American self-proclaimed psychic
- John F. McGee (1861–1925), U.S. federal judge
- John Joseph McGee (1845–1927), Clerk of the Privy Council of Canada

== See also ==
- Jack McGee (disambiguation)
- John Magee (disambiguation)
