= James McGhee (disambiguation) =

James McGhee (1862–1941) was a Scottish international footballer and football manager.

James McGhee may also refer to:

- James McGhee (Hibernian) (1861–1921), Irish nationalist
- James William McGhee (1882–1968), American inventor
- Jimmy McGhee (active 1920s), United States–based soccer player, son of James McGhee
- Jim McGhee (born 1930), Scottish footballer with clubs including Kilmarnock, Newport County and Ballymena United

== See also ==
- James Magee (disambiguation)
- James McGee (disambiguation)
- James McGhie, Lord McGhie, Scottish lawyer
- McGhee, a surname
