= Laura Magee =

Canadian physician and Professor

Laura Ann Magee
- Education: University of Toronto
- Spouse: Peter von Dadelszen
- Children: Emma von Dadelszen; Piers von Dadelszen; William von Dadelszen
- Parent(s): James Joseph Magee; Sheila Mary Magee
- Scientific career
- Workplaces: King's College London; St George's, University of London; University of British Columbia; University of Toronto; University of Oxford; Queen Charlotte's Hospital
- Thesis: 'Best evidence-based’ medicine in perinatal pharmacology; trials are not enough (1996)

Laura Magee is a Canadian physician (obstetric and general internal medicine) who is a Professor of Women's Health at King's College London and an Honorary Consultant Obstetric Physician at King's Health Partners. Her research has focussed on pregnancy hypertension and medical complications more broadly, using varied study designs, from evidence syntheses to surveys, qualitative research, randomised trials, and implementation studies.

== Early life and education ==
Having received her secondary education at Senator O'Connor College School, Magee was a medical student at the University of Toronto, receiving a MD(Hons) in 1987. She completed her clinical training in General Internal Medicine at the Toronto Western Hospital and Mount Sinai Hospital, where she was Chief Medical Resident. This was followed by a Clinical Pharmacology fellowship (perinatal pharmacology) at the Toronto Hospital for Sick Children. Magee is a Fellow of the Royal College of Physicians and Surgeons of Canada (FRCPC, 1992), the American College of Physicians (FACP), and the Royal College of Obstetricians and Gynaecologists (FRCOG ad eundem); she has the American Boards of Internal Medicine. She was supported by the Royal College of Physicians and Surgeons of Canada (Detweiler Travelling Fellowship) and Toronto Hospital for Sick Children (Duncan L Gordon Research Fellowship) to undertake obstetric medicine training with Christopher Redman at the University of Oxford and Michael de Swiet at Queen Charlotte's Hospital.. While in Oxford, Magee completed a Toronto Master of Science in clinical epidemiology investigating the effects of anthiypertensives in pregnancy, comparing randomised controlled trial evidence with data from cohort studies.

== Research and career ==
In 1996, Magee joined the University of Toronto as an assistant professor, where she developed research activity on obstetric epidemiology. In Toronto, Magee founded the Obstetric Medicine Training Programme. In 2000, she was appointed as a Clinical Assistant Professor in Medicine and Obsterics and Gynaecology at the University of British Columbia and Consultant in Obstetric Medicine at B.C. Women's Hospital & Health Centre and General Internal Medicine at Providence Health Care (Vancouver, Canada), with subsequent promotion to Clinical Associate Professor (2005) and Clinical Professor (2011).

In 2015, Magee joined St George's, University of London as Professor of Maternal Medicine, moving to King's College London as Professor of Women's Health in 2017. She is a member of the King's Global Health Institute.

As principal investigator, Magee has led the international Control of Hypertension in Pregnancy Study ("CHIPS".) and UK-based When to Induce Labour to Limit risk in pregnancy hypertension ("WILL".) trials, and been a co-investigstor in many others, most recently the "PREVENT-PE". and ongoing PREVENT-2 trials.

She has chaired two committees on Society of Obstetricians and Gynaecologists of Canada national guidelines, focussed on pregnancy hypertension and fetal neuroprotection, as well as two iterations of the International Society for the Study of Hypertension in Pregnancy (ISSHP) guidelines for low-, middle-, and high-income countries. Currently, she chairs the Green Top Guideline 37a committee (Reducing the Risk of Venous Thromboembolism during Pregnancy and the Puerperium), Royal College of Obstetricians and Gynaecologists.

Magee has been Director of the Canadian Perinatal Network; President of the ISSHP; and Chair of both the Maternal Medicine Clinical Study Group, Royal College of Obstetricians and Gynaecologists, and the Diabetes in Pregnancy Working Group, Diabetes UK.

Magee has over 500 publications cited in PubMed and a Scopus h-index over 80.

== Awards and honours ==
- With her husband and colleague, Peter von Dadelszen, Magee was the recipient of the International Society for the Study of Hypertension in Pregnancy Chesley Award (2014)

== Selected publications ==
- Mark A Brown; Magee, Laura; Kenny, Louise Clare; S Ananth Karumanchi; McCarthy, Fergus; Saitō, Shigeru; David R Hall; Charlotte E Warren; Gloria Adoyi; Salisu Ishaku; International Society for the Study of Hypertension in Pregnancy (ISSHP) (2018). "Hypertensive Disorders of Pregnancy: ISSHP Classification, Diagnosis, and Management Recommendations for International Practice". Hypertension. 72 (1): 24–43. doi:10.1161/hypertensionaha.117.10803. PMID 29899139. Wikidata Q89093946.
- Tranquilli, Andrea Luigi; G Dekker; Magee, Laura; J Roberts; B M Sibai; W Steyn; G G Zeeman; M A Brown (2014). "The classification, diagnosis and management of the hypertensive disorders of pregnancy: A revised statement from the ISSHP". Pregnancy hypertension. 4 (2): 97–104. doi:10.1016/j.preghy.2014.02.001. PMID 26104417. Wikidata Q85446003.
- Peter von Dadelszen; Magee, Laura; Roberts, James (2003). "Subclassification of preeclampsia". Hypertension in Pregnancy. 22 (2): 143–148. doi:10.1081/prg-120021060. PMID 12908998. Wikidata Q35196220.
