= Reg Gammon =

English painter and illustrator

- Born: Reginald William Gammon; 9 January 1894; Petersfield, Hampshire, England
- Died: 22 April 1997 (aged 103); Bridgwater, Somerset, England
- Occupations: Painter and illustrator

Reginald William "Reg" Gammon (9 January 1894 – 22 April 1997) was an English painter and illustrator.

== Biography ==
Gammon was born in Petersfield, Hampshire, on 9 January 1894 and educated at Churcher's College there. His father was a builder.

== Career ==
From 1911, he was apprenticed to the illustrator Frank Patterson, at the latter's Billingshurst, West Sussex studio. He was discharged on medical grounds after enlisting during World War I, but re-enlisted with the Army Service Corps for the final two years of the war. He married Betty Knight (died 1982) in 1917. After the war, they lived in Fernhurst, Sussex, and had two sons.

Gammon declined a 1918 offer, made at the instigation of Scottish etcher Muirhead Bone, of a place at the Slade School of Fine Art, but nonetheless had a successful career as a freelance illustrator and writer. For 60 years he wrote and illustrated a feature column for the Cyclists Touring Club's Gazette. The dropping of another column, "In the Open Air", for Scout magazine, resulted in international protests and it was restored.

In 1930, he began to produce work for the News Chronicle. Travelling by motorcycle, he would attend horseracing at Goodwood or motor racing at Brooklands, make sketches, and ride quickly back to London to deliver them. He also covered the Monte Carlo Rally.

During World War II he moved his family to South Wales, and became a hill farmer, managing 40 acres (16 ha) in the Llanthony valley near Abergavenny. He stayed there for 20 years, and was instrumental in the introduction of electricity supply and telephone services to Llanthony. He moved to Somerset in 1958 and became a full-time painter.

He originally painted in watercolour, but on holiday in his 60s, he began to use oil paint. His work was influenced by Paul Gauguin and he later worked in the expressionist style. He was elected to the Royal West of England Academy (RWA) in 1966. They held a retrospective of his work in 1985, and in 1986 he held the first of five one-man exhibitions at the New Grafton Gallery in London. A further retrospective was held at the RWA to mark his 100th birthday. He was also a member of the Royal Watercolour Society and the Royal Institute of Oil Painters.

Among the books illustrated by Gammon are a number in the 'Romany' series, by George Bramwell Evens. Gammon's autobiography, One man's furrow, was published in 1990.

Gammon died at Bridgwater, Somerset on 22 April 1997, aged 103. The RWA holds a number of his works.

== Bibliography ==
- Gammon, Reg; Enid Fairhead (1990). One man's furrow: ninety years of country living. Webb & Bower. ISBN 9780863503290.

=== Works illustrated ===
- Baron, Stanley R (1934). Westward Ho. Jarrold.
- Evens, George Bramwell (1937). Out with Romany. University of London Press.
- Evens, George Bramwell (1934). A Romany on the Trail. Epworth Press.
- Evens, George Bramwell (1938). Out with Romany Again. University of London Press.
- Evens, George Bramwell (1940). Out with Romany Once More. University of London Press.
- Evens, George Bramwell (1941). Out with Romany by the Sea. University of London Press.
- Evens, George Bramwell (1942). Out with Romany by Meadow and Stream. University of London Press.
- Evens, George Bramwell (1944). Out with Romany by Moor and Dale. University of London Press.
- Evens, Glyn K. Muriel & Doris. University of London Press.
- Morgan, D. Francis. Exploring England. C. Arthur Pearson Ltd.
- Way, H. John (1956). Italy. Nicholas Kane.
- Way, H. John (1957). The Low Countries. Nicholas Kane.
- Way, H. John (1958). Austria. Nicholas Kane.
- Way, H. John (1960). France. Nicholas Kane.
