= James Magee =

James Magee may refer to:

- James Magee (artist) (1945–2024), American artist
- James Magee (sportsman, born 1872) (1872–1949), Irish cricketer and rugby union player
- James Magee (cricketer, born 1995), Irish cricketer
- James Magee (sea captain) (1750–1801), American sea captain and businessman
- James McDevitt Magee (1877–1949), American politician
- James C. Magee (1883–1975), American medical officer
- Jim Magee (American football) (1920–2001), lineman in the National Football League for the Boston Yanks
- Jimmy Magee (1935–2017), Irish sports broadcaster

== See also ==
- James McGee (disambiguation)
- James McGhee (disambiguation)
