= Joel Schectman =

American journalist

- Education: Emerson College
- Occupation: Journalist
- Employer: Wall Street Journal

Joel Schectman is an American reporter. As of 2025, he covers national security for the Wall Street Journal. He previously worked for Reuters and Newsweek. Schectman studied film at Emerson College and received a master's degree in journalism from the Craig Newmark Graduate School of Journalism at the City University of New York.

== Notable work ==
Schectman and two colleagues received the 2017 Reuters Scoop of the Year Award for revealing how Big Tech companies had surreptitiously allowed the Government of Russia to probe systems sold to the U.S. Department of Defense for potential vulnerability. The story led to the enactment of new federal legislation.

Schectman and several colleagues were recipients of the 2017 National Press Club's Edwin M. Hood Award — Print for their series of reports on U.S.-Iran prisoner exchanges during the presidency of Barack Obama.

In 2020, Schectman was co-recipient of the National Press Club's Edwin M. Hood Award — Print for "Project Raven", a Reuters report in which he and Christopher Bing unearthed failures in an NSA anti-terrorism program with the United Arab Emirates. "Project Raven" also received a citation for "best investigative reporting in any medium in an international story" from the Overseas Press Club.

Three years later, in 2023, Schectman was the co-recipient of the Edwin M. Hood Award — Print for “America’s Throwaway Spies", a Reuters story in which he and Bozorgmehr Sharafedin reported on failures by the Central Intelligence Agency to support or aid its agents in Iran.

Schectman and Aruna Viswanatha received the 2026 Michael A. Dornheim Award for Aerospace, Defense, and Aviation Reporting from the National Press Club for their long-running investigation that uncovered how the U.S. military fabricated evidence of UFOs and allowed rumors about alien visitation to circulate for the purpose of obscuring the existence of real weapons programs.

== See also ==
- Project Raven
