= James A. McGee =

Canadian ice hockey player

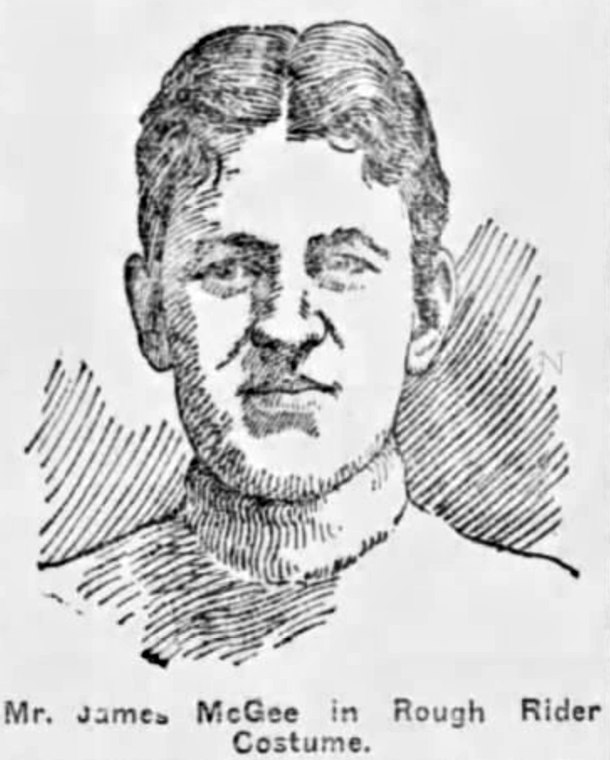
- A sketch of McGee in a 1904 edition of Ottawa Citizen
- Born: May 16, 1879; Ottawa, Ontario, Canada
- Died: May 14, 1904 (aged 24)
- Father: John Joseph McGee
- Relatives: Frank McGee (brother); Thomas D'Arcy McGee (uncle)
- Rugby league career

Playing information
Club
Years	Team	Pld	T	G	FG	P
c. 1899–1904	Ottawa Football Club
Ice hockey career
- Played for: Ottawa Aberdeens; Ottawa Silver Seven

James Aloysius "Jim" McGee (May 16, 1879 – May 14, 1904) was a Canadian athlete. He played rugby football for and was captain of the Ottawa Football Club football team in the early 1900s. He was also an ice hockey player for the Ottawa Silver Seven, a member of the Silver Seven 1903–04 Stanley Cup championship team, and a member of the Ottawa Rowing Club. After the Stanley Cup win, McGee was killed in a horseback riding accident in May 1904. His younger brother Frank also played ice hockey.

== Personal life ==
Born in Ottawa, Jim McGee came from a prominent Canadian family. His late uncle, Thomas D'Arcy McGee, had been a Father of Confederation. His father, John Joseph McGee, was clerk of the Privy Council (considered the top civil servant position). He had five brothers and two sisters. His younger brother Frank is famous for his ice hockey exploits with the Silver Seven.

On May 9, 1904, McGee was riding a horse as part of a horse riding class. The horse threw him and McGee lapsed into a coma from which he would not recover, succumbing on May 14, 1904. His funeral service, at St. Joseph's Church on May 16, 1904, was attended by Prime Minister Wilfrid Laurier, Chief Justice Henri Elzéar Taschereau, the Ottawa Hockey Club, Ottawa Football Club and Ottawa Rowing Club. The cortege was estimated at a half-mile in length. He was interred at Ottawa's Notre Dame Cemetery.

== Playing career ==
McGee played in the Canadian Amateur Hockey League (CAHL) intermediate division for both the Ottawa Aberdeens and the Ottawa Hockey Club 'Seconds'. Although he played for the senior Ottawa Hockey Club as early as 1900, he only fully made the club in 1903-04. The club had already won the Stanley Cup when McGee joined. McGee played in the CAHL regular season and in the Stanley Cup challenges held in 1904 against the Montreal Wanderers and Brandon Wheat City.

McGee also played rugby football for the Ottawa Football Club. When he died, McGee was captain of the club and had played for the club for five seasons.
