= William J. McGee =

American consumer advocate

William J. McGee is an American consumer advocate. He is a Senior Fellow for Aviation and Travel at the American Economic Liberties Project.

== Early life and education ==
Born in the neighborhood of Jackson Heights, Queens in New York City, McGee grew up alongside ten siblings with the desire to become an author. He received a BA from Hofstra University in 1984 and an MFA from Columbia University.

== Career ==
From 1985 to 1992, McGee worked in airline ground operations and flight operations management for Overseas National Airways, Emery Worldwide, Tower Air, and Pan Am Shuttle. He was based in New York at both JFK and LaGuardia Airports, Chicopee, Massachusetts, and Miami, with extended assignments in Crawley, United Kingdom, Helsinki, Finland, Bangkok, Thailand, and other locations. The Federal Aviation Administration licensed him as an Aircraft Dispatcher in 1990.

In 1992, McGee launched a career in travel and aviation journalism, working and freelancing for a number of travel and consumer publications. He was a Managing Editor at Travel Agent Magazine from 1998 to 2000. He then became editor-in-chief of Consumer Reports Travel Letter from 2000 to 2003. From 2003 to 2019, he wrote a monthly column, "Behind the Screen", about air travel in USA Today. His freelance work has appeared numerous publications including The New York Times, Washington Post, Condé Nast Traveler, Time, Money, The Daily Beast, Good Housekeeping.

McGee taught undergraduate and graduate creative writing at Hofstra University for ten years. He also has taught and lectured at Vaughn College of Aeronautics, Long Island University, and National University of Ireland, Galway.

In 2010, Transportation Secretary Raymond LaHood appointed McGee to the Future of Aviation Advisory Committee. He was the single consumer advocate on the committee.

In 2012, McGee published his book Attention All Passengers, a critique of the airline industry.

In 2018, McGee published the book Half the Child, a novel about an air traffic controller in a child custody fight.

In 2022, McGee became a Senior Fellow for Aviation and Travel at the American Economic Liberties Project.

In the aftermath of the 2022 Southwest Airlines flight delays, McGee called the situation "unprecedented" and said transportation Secretary Pete Buttigieg "..has been a tremendous disappointment." McGee called the Southwest Airlines failures "inevitable" due to Department of Transportation inaction. He stated that Buttigieg "spent months appearing to regulate rather than actually regulating". McGee is supportive of new legislation that would allow states to take action against airlines, something currently not possible under the 1978 Airline Deregulation Act.

=== Civil Air Patrol service ===
From 2002 to 2012, McGee served in the U.S. Air Force Auxiliary/Civil Air Patrol as a First Lieutenant, working as a Flight Release Officer and Communications Officer.

== Awards and honors ==
McGee's work has received numerous awards. In 2008, he was awarded the inaugural Michael A. Dornheim Award from the National Press Club for his combined work at Consumer Reports, Condé Nast Traveler, Money Magazine, and USAToday.

== Books ==
- Attention All Passengers (HarperCollins, 2012)
- Half the Child (2018)
