= Willie McGee (disambiguation) =

Willie McGee may refer to:

- Willie McGee (born 1958), is an American retired baseball player
- Willie McGee (American football) (born 1950), former American football player
- Willie McGee (convict) (died 1951), African American who was controversially sentenced to death in 1945 for rape
- Willie McGee (Gaelic footballer) (born 1947), Irish Gaelic footballer
- Willie Magee (cyclist), British Olympic cyclist

== See also ==
- William McGee (disambiguation)
