= Frank McGee =

Frank McGee may refer to:

- Frank McGee (baseball) (1899–1934), Major League first baseman
- Frank McGee (ice hockey) (1882–1916), ice hockey player
- Frank McGee (journalist) (1921–1974), broadcast journalist
- Frank Charles McGee (1926–1999), member of the Parliament of Canada

== See also ==
- Frank Magee, film editor
- Frank McGee (comics), a Marvel comics character
