= David Gee (forger) =

(1929–2013) Chinese-Australian coin expert, dealer, collector, and forger

David Allan Gee (c. 1929 – 13 June 2013) was a Chinese Australian coin expert, dealer, collector, and forger. Born Yon Chu Chee in the province of Guangzhou, he arrived in Australia in June 1939 aboard the SS Changtsu. In 1963 he was found guilty of two charges of possessing false die plates resembling those used for the production of postage stamps.

He became a coin dealer and exhibitor of adult films. Gee created forgeries of just about all of Australia's rarest coins.

Gee's most prized work, amongst collectors, are arguably the gold pieces he produces including his 1852 Adelaide Assay Office pieces, his 1853 Kangaroo Office Port Phillip pieces and his Sydney Mint 1853 pattern examples.

In 1979, he was sentenced to seven years jail for forging coins.

According to his friend Jim Henderson, controller of the Royal Australian Mint, "the twelve-sided design for the nation's fifty cent piece was substantially Gee's." Gee died in June 2013.

How does the market view pieces from the Gee ‘private mint’?

To call Gee a reproductionist is to be too forgiving but Gee was without question an audacious forger who produced some very high quality pieces. Gee’s work never came from an Australian mint but some of numismatics most recognised apex pieces also never did. For some Gee is a blight on the numismatic landscape that they would have surgically removed if they could. For others Gee is the bad boy they admire for his absolute audacity. Gee’s best work is outstanding. Gee’s lesser work representing who he was, a forger working towards a final product capable of fooling the best. By the early 70’s Gee was in his prime and some of his work is of such a high quality that in some cases it requires forensic level scrutiny to detect. Gee’s work entered the general market in volume after his death in June 2013, initially seen in numbers at Status auction house. Adelaide Pounds and other Assay Office pieces, Kangaroo Office pieces, rare sovereigns of all types, the 1909 Florin, and pattern Kookaburras, early pattern 1853 Sydney Mint pieces to name a few. Examples of Gee’s work appear on different metals and at different stages of development. Everything from lead squeezes, through unifaces, white metal, copper, bronze and silver pressings, some pressing that have gilt, all the way to full 22ct gold pieces. Most Gee items fetch good money. Some items are seen as very desirable. An Adelaide Pound (type I) in gold sold for $1000 in 2013 at Status. A poor obverse 1909 Florin fetched $1200 at IAG 2016. A very nice 1909 florin uniface passing $1000 at Roxby in recent years. A bronze set of the four Kangaroo Office rounds with a poor ¼ ounce example sailed over $600 at Noble, a Gee copper 1854 dated Kangaroo Office 2oz went very cheaply but still fetching north of $300 and some lovely 1902 sovereign examples also gaining good money. A Gee Taylor 4 pence fetch $4000 at a recent Noble auction. From the get go Gees’ work has attracted buyers. Many of the rarer pieces that Gee produced in gold were ‘sold out’ early and have not been seen since such is their quality and desirability. Most recently at IAG sale 98 in 2023 just 5 Gee pieces fetch a combined $18000+ before buyer’s premium. At a Noble auction in 2023 a Gee 2oz Port Phillip piece in gold fetched $9000 before adding commission. A Gee piece typically starts around $500 and climbs to well into the thousands depending on the piece/s and material. Not all Gee’s are his best work but just being a Gee piece seems to be significant enough to attract attention. Many coins are a ‘show and tell’ items and there is no story in Australian numismatics that even comes close to that which accompanies a piece from the David Gee era.
