= Jack McGee (Canadian football) =

Canadian football guard

Profile
- Position: Guard

Personal information
- Born: ca. 1932; Toronto, Ontario
- Died: August 16, 2009 (aged 77); Peterborough, Ontario
- Listed height: 5 ft 11 in (1.80 m)
- Listed weight: 205 lb (93 kg)

Career information
- University: Queen's Golden Gaels

Career history
- 1954: Toronto Argonauts
- 1955: Hamilton Tiger-Cats

Jack McGee (ca. 1932 – August 16, 2009) was a professional Canadian football player. Born and raised in Toronto, Ontario, McGee attended Queen's University in Kingston, Ontario, and played university football for the Queen's Golden Gaels. In 1954, he played for the Toronto Argonauts and, in 1955, he played for the Hamilton Tiger-Cats. He and his wife Mary had four children, Steven, David, Suzi, and J.R.. He died on August 16, 2009, in Peterborough, Ontario, at the age of 77.
