= John Joseph McGee =

Clerk of the Privy Council
- In office May 20, 1882 – May 5, 1907
- Preceded by: Joseph-Olivier Coté
- Succeeded by: Rodolphe Boudreau

Personal details
- Born: August 6, 1845 Wexford, Ireland
- Died: April 10, 1927 (aged 81)

John Joseph McGee (August 6, 1845 – April 10, 1927) was Clerk of the Privy Council of Canada from May 20, 1882 to May 5, 1907 and is the longest-serving occupant of the position.

Born in Wexford, Ireland, McGee immigrated to Canada in 1863 at the request of his half-brother D'Arcy McGee. He finished his education at McGill University and joined the civil service in 1879 as a first class clerk in the Department of the Interior. He became Assistant Clerk of the Queen's Privy Council in 1880 and became Clerk of the Privy Council two years later.

== Personal life ==
McGee married Elizabeth Crotty and the couple had nine children, six sons (Charles, D'Arcy, Frank, James, John Jr. and Walter) and three daughters, (Katharine, Lillian and May). Sons Frank and James achieved prominence in ice hockey and other sports. D'Arcy became a prominent lawyer in Ottawa. Charles, Frank, John and Walter all served in the Canadian army in World War I. Charles and Frank died serving for Canada. James died in 1904 of a horse-riding accident.
