= John Magee =

John Magee may refer to:

- John Magee (bishop) (born 1936), Roman Catholic Bishop Emeritus of Cloyne, the former private secretary of Popes Paul VI, John Paul I and John Paul II
- John Magee (congressman) (1794–1868), US Representative from New York State
- John Magee (missionary) (1884–1953), American Episcopal pastor who filmed Nanking massacre victims
- John Magee (journalist) (died 1809) Irish journalist
- John Gillespie Magee Jr. (1922–1941), American aviator and poet
- John Alexander Magee (1827–1903), US Representative from Pennsylvania
- John Magee (American football) (1923–1991), American football player for the Philadelphia Eagles
- Johnny Magee (born 1978), Irish Gaelic footballer
- Jack Magee (1883–1968), American track and field coach
- John L. Magee (artist) (c. 1820s–1870s?), American artist and lithographer
- John L. Magee (chemist) (1914–2005), American radiation chemist
- John W. Magee (1859–?), American Medal of Honor recipient

== See also ==
- John McGee (disambiguation)
