= Thomas McGee =

Thomas McGee may refer to:

- Thomas D'Arcy McGee (1825–1868), Irish–Canadian politician
- Thomas M. McGee (born 1955), Mayor of Lynn, Massachusetts
- Thomas W. McGee (1924–2012), speaker of the Massachusetts House of Representatives
- Tommy McGee (born 1979), Scottish rugby union footballer
