= Herbert Leslie Gee =

English writer (1901–1977)

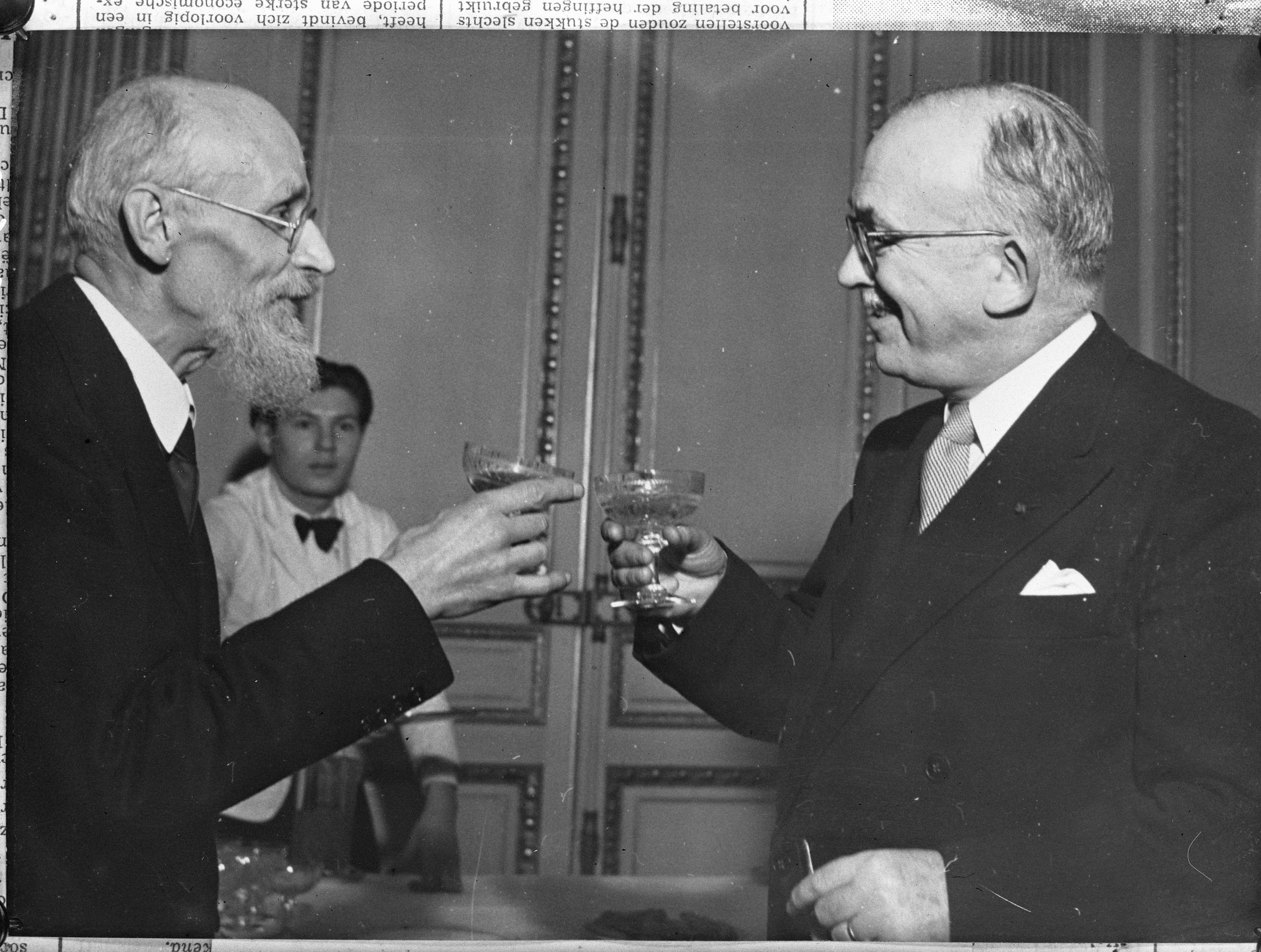
Francis Gay PLEASE CHECK which of the two is Francis Gay/Herbert Leslie Gee

Herbert Leslie Gee (1901–1977) was a prolific English writer, mostly about the coast and countryside of Yorkshire, his native county. He wrote under both his own name and the pseudonym Francis Gay, under which he was responsible for the annual Friendship Books (first published in 1939).

He was an ardent Methodist. For some of his life he lived in Bridlington.

== Publications ==
- 500 Tales to Tell Again (1955)
- The Adventures of Billy Bounser and Tommy Terror (1944)
- Always it is Spring (1951)
- American England (1943)
- And Pastures New (1954)
- Another Cheerful Day (1945)
- As it Happened (1955)
- Briefly: An Anthology of Wit and Wisdom (1964)
- Bright Interlude (Epworth Press, 1949), an account of a family holiday in Sandbourne
- Busy Streets (1950)
- Caravan Joe (1953)
- Chance Acquaintances
- The Cheerful Day (1950)
- Cloud and Sunshine: Some Account of a Plain Man’s Journey By Car from Yorkshire to the Cotswolds and Back (1953)
- Count Your Blessings (1955)
- The Daily Round (1947)
- Day Book for 1940 (1939)
- Day is Done (1970)
- Do You Agree? (1960)
- Don't Lose Heart (1942)
- Easter at Epworth (1944)
- Folk tales of Yorkshire (1952)
- Friendly Folk (1946)
- The Friendly House (1939)
- The Friendly Year (1941)
- Gallant Folk (1957)
- Gay Adventure (1948)
- Good in Everything (1946)
- Good Samaritans (1957)
- Happy Folk (1955)
- Hymns that Come to Life (1954)
- Immortal Few The Story of the Battle of Britain in Verse (1943)
- It Seems to Me (1962)
- Johnny Brown (1953)
- Little Old Lady (1958)
- Morning Noon and Night (1955)
- Mrs Bowser Starts Again (1941)
- My Cup Runneth Over
- Neighbours and Friends (1942)
- Neighbours (1942)
- New Thoughts of God (1955)
- Nodding Wold (1949)
- Of Countless Price (1955)
- On My Way (1956)
- One Fine Day (1956)
- People I meet (1949)
- The Pilgrim (1941)
- Pleasant People (1939)
- Pleasure Book (1955)
- The Romance of the Yorkshire Coast (1928)
- Second Pleasure Book (1956)
- Share My Harvest (1950)
- The Shining Highway (1956)
- So Much to Do (1955)
- Some Softening Gleam (1950)
- The Spirit of the Romany, an anthology of writing by wild life broadcaster George Bramwell Evens, better known as "Romany of the BBC". This was one of Gee's bestselling books.
- Story Book for Boys and Girls (1958)
- The Sunny Room (1942)
- Tales of Today (1949)
- Tales They Tell Us in Yorkshire (1954)
- Talking by the Fire (1950)
- Talking in the Garden (1949)
- Talking Out of Doors (1948)
- Telling Tales (1962)
- The Official Guide to Chislehurst (1919)
- There and Back (1956)
- They Come to My Door (1950)
- This and Every Day (1950)
- This Kind World (1949)
- Three Hundred Thrilling Tales (1937)
- Through the Year (1953)
- Twins at Peep-O-Day Farm (1950)
- The Twins in London (1950)
- The Twins on Holiday (1949)
- Up Hill and Down (1946)
- Wartime Pilgrimage (1943)
- Wings on My Shoes (1963)
- Winter Journey (1939)
- The Wonders of Your House (1938)
- Yorkshire Wit and Humour (1962)

== Sources ==
- GoogleBooks: Gee, H. L., in Dictionary of Pseudonyms: 13,000 Assumed Names and Their Origins (5th edn) by Adrian Room
- Worldcat.org: Gee, H L
