= Sears McGee =

American judge (1917–2006)

Justice of the Supreme Court of Texas
- In office January 1, 1969 – December 31, 1986
- Preceded by: Meade F. Griffin
- Succeeded by: Oscar Mauzy

Personal details
- Born: September 29, 1917 Houston, Texas, U.S.
- Died: August 4, 2006 (aged 88) Austin, Texas, U.S.
- Party: Democratic
- Education: Rice Institute; University of Texas School of Law

William Sears McGee (September 29, 1917 – August 4, 2006) was a justice of the Supreme Court of Texas from January 1, 1969 to December 31, 1986.

Political offices
Preceded by Meade F. Griffin	Justice of the Texas Supreme Court; 1969–1986	Succeeded by Oscar H. Mauzy
