= Maggie Gee (pilot) =

American aviator

Margaret "Maggie" Gee
- Born: Gee Mei Gue; August 5, 1923; Berkeley, California
- Died: February 1, 2013 (aged 89)
- Occupations: Pilot, physicist and researcher
- Known for: One of two Chinese-American women pilots during World War II

Maggie Gee (August 5, 1923 – February 1, 2013) was an American aviator who served in the Women Airforce Service Pilots (WASP) in World War II. She was one of two Chinese-American women to serve in the organization, the other being Hazel Ying Lee. As a WASP pilot, she helped male pilots train for combat, since female pilots were not allowed to serve in combat at that time. She also ferried military aircraft. After serving as a WASP, she held a career as a research physicist and political activist against racial discrimination.

== Childhood ==
Gee, one of six children, was born in Berkeley, California, August 5, 1923. She was a third-generation Chinese American; her maternal grandparents had moved to California from a village in Guangdong. Her grandfather was a pioneer in the abalone industry on the Monterey Peninsula. Gee's father was a businessman from Hong Kong, and her mother (Ah Yoke Gee) was a second-generation Chinese-American. Because her father had immigrated to the US, her mother lost her US citizenship due to the terms of the Cable Act of 1922. Her father passed due to a heart attack when Gee was six years old.

Growing up, Gee frequently spent time at the airfield with family watching the takeoff of various planes. One of her role models was Amelia Earhart, and wanting to fly became a goal for her. However, due to the cost, she was unable to have that opportunity. Additionally, the era that Gee grew up in was marked by racial segregation and discrimination against Chinese Americans, especially on the topic of housing.

== World War II and WASP service ==
1941, with the attack on Pearl Harbor, marked the start of the second world war for the US. At this time, Gee was a freshman enrolled at the University of California, Berkeley to study physics. With the beginning of the war, her brothers enlisted towards the war effort, and her mother worked at the Mare Island Naval Shipyard as a welder. Gee dropped out after a few months to work in the drafting department at the Mare Island Naval Shipyard. While at the shipyard, she also worked in the engineering department, where she was one of a few women, assisting with repairing ships. Gee befriended these two other women, and they decided to apply together to the WASP program. Gee and two co-workers bought a car for US$25 (using the money they had earned working in the shipyard) and drove to Avenger Field in Sweetwater, Texas, where she trained for six months to become a WASP. After the completion of the application process, the WASP program comprised 1,074 pilots (out of 25,000 total applicants, 8% acceptance rate), of which there were no black women, two Chinese-Americans, one Native-American, and a few Jewish women. Gee graduated from the WASP training program as part of Class 44-W-9 on November 8, 1944.

At the time of its initiation, becoming a WASP did not award those who were deployed military status; the WASP was considered a civilian organization. The program was used as an assistance for the formal US military, and the start of the program allowed male pilots to be deployed elsewhere. In her time as a WASP, Gee was assigned to work at the Nellis Air Force Base in Nevada. Gee realized that she and her fellow pilots shared a love of flying and patriotism. Some of her jobs while working as a WASP included preparing planes for war, training male pilots for use of their instruments, and copiloting B-17 aircraft during gunnery practice. She and her co-WASPs could use their experiences to expand on a women's capabilities in the military, she also details that she experienced sexism and discrimination while serving; these remarks were challenges that WASPs accepted in continuing to fly.

An experience of note that Gee recalled involves racial discrimination; she was mistaken as being of Japanese descent, one of the enemy states of the US during WWII. Once, after landing a plane, she was mistaken by a pilot for being an enemy pilot, a Japanese kamikaze, or a spy. Gee's responded by stating that she was an American.

== Post-WWII: physics and politics ==
After World War II and her WASP service, Gee returned to Berkeley to complete her degree in physics. Gee joined in the Army in the 1950s, and she ran service clubs in Germany for four years. Later, for the next thirty years (starting in 1958), she worked at the University of California's Lawrence Livermore National Laboratory in the fields of weapons systems and nuclear and magnetic fusion. She helped the lab design nuclear warheads and the Poseidon missile. She retired in 1988 but stayed involved with the university as an advisor to the program.

The end of the war and return to society meant that America's sense of community and common purpose that defined the war was dispersed. Gee recalls attempting to rent a home in Berkeley but being denied because she was Chinese-American. In her career in politics, she advocated against housing discrimination and held state and Democratic party political positions, including being a part of the 1992 Democratic Party Platform Committee. Gee also served for many decades as an elected member of the Alameda County Democratic Central Committee, supporting voter registration and fundraising. She also served for many years as a long-time Board member and Treasurer of the Berkeley Democratic Club in Berkeley, California. She has also served on the California Democratic Party Executive Board and Asian Pacific Islander Democratic Caucus.

== Awards and recognition ==
She is featured in a number of books, oral history projects, and documentaries. In 2009, a book was published about her life story called Sky High: The True Story of Maggie Gee, by Marissa Moss. In 2010, she and all other living WASP pilots received the Congressional Gold Medal. She also posthumously received a second Congressional Gold Medal for being a Chinese-American veteran of WWII. In 2014, she was inducted into the Nevada Aerospace Hall of Fame in recognition towards being one of the first women in history to American military aircraft in defense of America's freedom.
