= Thomas D'Arcy McGee =

Canadian Father of Confederation (1825–1868)

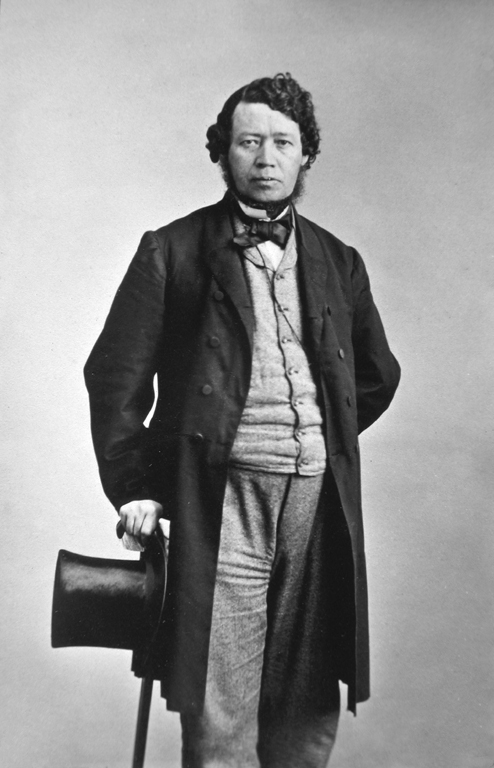

Member of the Canadian Parliament for Montreal West
- In office 24 September 1867 – 7 April 1868
- Preceded by: Riding established
- Succeeded by: Michael Patrick Ryan

Personal details
- Born: 13 April 1825 Carlingford, County Louth, Ireland
- Died: 7 April 1868 (aged 42) Ottawa, Ontario, Canada
- Cause of death: Assassination (gunshot wound)
- Party: Liberal-Conservative
- Relatives: John Joseph McGee (half-brother); James A. McGee (nephew); Frank McGee (ice hockey) (nephew); Frank Charles McGee (great-nephew)

Thomas D'Arcy McGee (13 April 1825 – 7 April 1868) was an Irish-Canadian politician, Catholic spokesman, journalist, poet, and a Father of Canadian Confederation. The young McGee was an Irish Catholic who opposed British rule in Ireland, and was part of the Young Ireland attempts to overthrow British rule and create an independent Irish Republic. He escaped arrest and fled to the United States in 1848, after which some of his political positions reversed. He remained ardently Catholic, but his Irish nationalism moderated. He became disgusted with American republicanism, Anti-Catholicism, and classical liberalism. McGee became intensely monarchistic in his political beliefs and in his religious support for the embattled Pope Pius IX.

He moved to the Province of Canada in 1857 and worked hard to convince fellow Irish Canadians to cooperate with Canadian Protestants in forming a self-governing Canada within the British Empire. His passion for Confederation garnered him the title: 'Canada's first nationalist'. McGee also vocally denounced the activities of the Fenian Brotherhood, a paramilitary secret society of exiled Irish Republicans who resembled his younger self politically, in Ireland, Canada, and the United States. McGee succeeded in helping achieve Confederation in 1867. He was assassinated in 1868. Patrick J. Whelan, a member of the Fenian Brotherhood from Montreal, was convicted of McGee's murder and executed.

== Early life ==
Widely known as D'Arcy McGee, he was born on 13 April 1825 in Carlingford, Ireland, and raised as a Roman Catholic. From his mother, the daughter of a Dublin bookseller he learned the history of Ireland, which later influenced his writing and political activity. When he was eight years old, his family moved to Wexford, where his father, James McGee, was employed by the Irish coast guard (then under His Majesty's Coastguard and likely at the Wexford Town Station near Customs House Quay.

In Wexford he attended a local hedge school, where the teacher, Michael Donnelly, fed his hunger for knowledge and where he learned of the long history of opposition to British rule in Ireland, including the Irish Rebellion of 1798. In 1842 at age 17, McGee left Ireland with his sister due to a poor relationship with their stepmother, Margaret Dea, who had married his father in 1840 after the death of his mother 22 August 1833. In 1842 he sailed from Wexford harbour aboard the brig Leo, bound for the United States. On the Leo he wrote many of his early poems, mostly about Ireland.

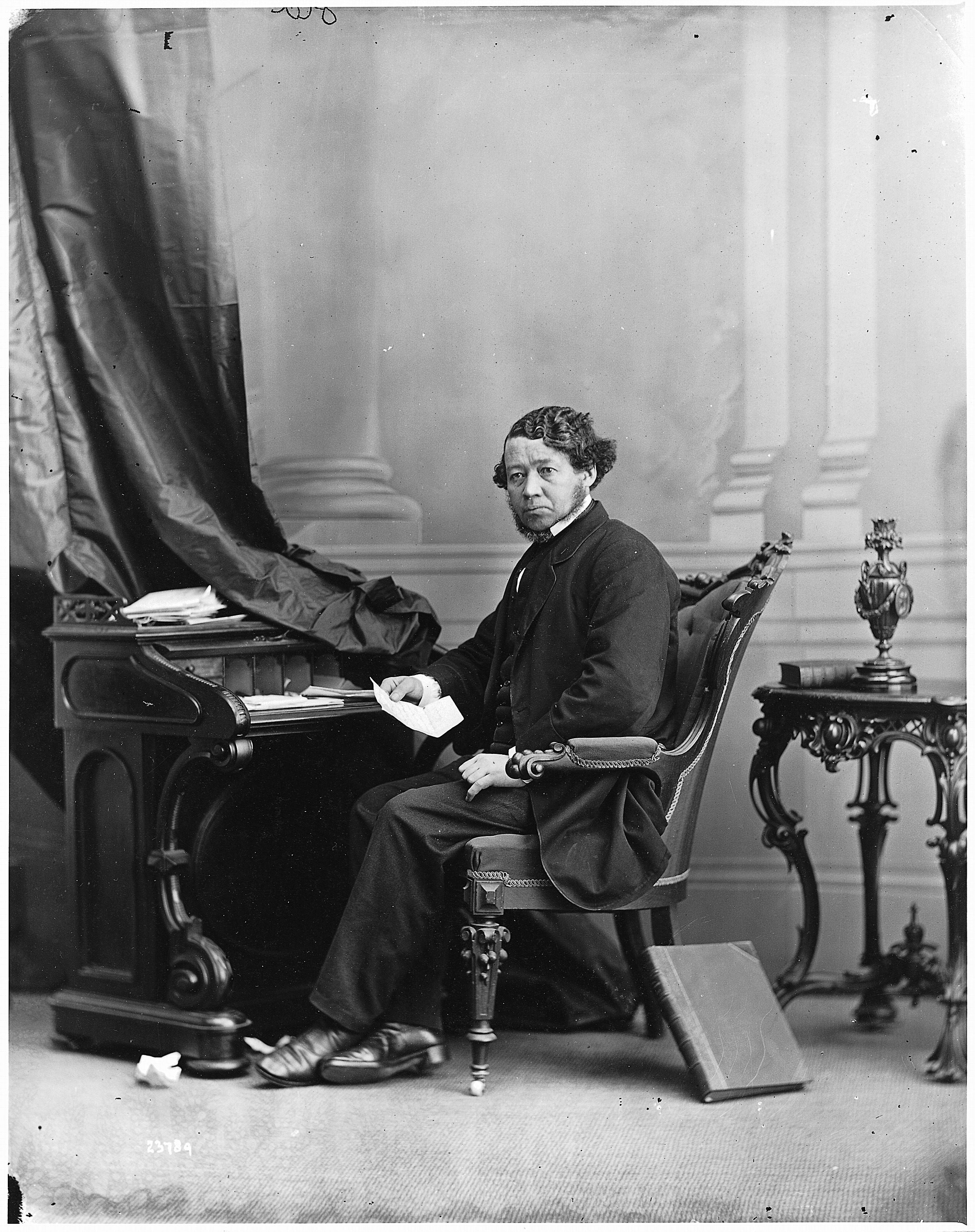
Thomas D'Arcy McGee taken in Montreal in 1866 at William Notman's studio.

He soon found work as assistant editor of Patrick Donahoe's Boston Pilot, a Catholic newspaper in Boston, Massachusetts. He specialized in articles expounding the movement for Irish self-determination led by Daniel O’Connell. He became the lead editor in 1844, While writing widely as well on Irish literature and politics. He advocated the union of Canada into the United States, saying, "Either by purchase, conquest, or stipulation, Canada must be yielded by Great Britain to this Republic."

In 1845, he returned to Ireland where he became politically active and edited The Nation, the voice of the Young Ireland movement. In 1847, he married Mary Theresa Caffrey; they had six children but only two daughters survived their father. His involvement in the Irish Confederation and Young Irelander Rebellion of 1848 resulted in a warrant for his arrest. McGee escaped disguised as a priest and returned to the United States.

== United States ==
In the United States, he achieved prominence in Irish-American circles and founded and edited the New York-based Nation and the Boston-based American Celt. He also wrote a number of history books. In common with several other Young Ireland émigrés, McGee espoused proslavery thought and defended the continuation of slavery in the United States. In the 4 August 1849 edition of the Nation, McGee attacked supporters of the abolitionist Daniel O'Connell in the United States, writing that "Their task is to liberate their slaves, not to travel across the Atlantic for foreign objects of sympathy."

McGee eventually grew disillusioned with democracy, republicanism and the United States. Historian David Gerber traces a dramatic transformation from the Young Ireland revolutionary who sought a peasant rebellion to overthrow British rule in Ireland. Gerber writes:

After 1851, however, he veered increasingly toward the opposite pole, espousing an ultramontane conservatism.... Catholic dogma and triumphalism, anti-Protestantism, cultural nationalism, and social conservatism were the framework of McGee's thought during the 1850s.

He emigrated to Montreal in 1857, believing Canada was far more hospitable to the Catholic Irish than was the United States. He downplayed the importance of the Orange Order in Canada. He remained a persistent critic of American institutions, and of the American way of life. He accused the Americans of hostile and expansionist motives toward Canada and of desiring to spread its republican ideas over all of North America. McGee worked energetically for continued Canadian devotion to the British Empire, seeing it as necessary to protect Canada from American influence.

== Canada ==
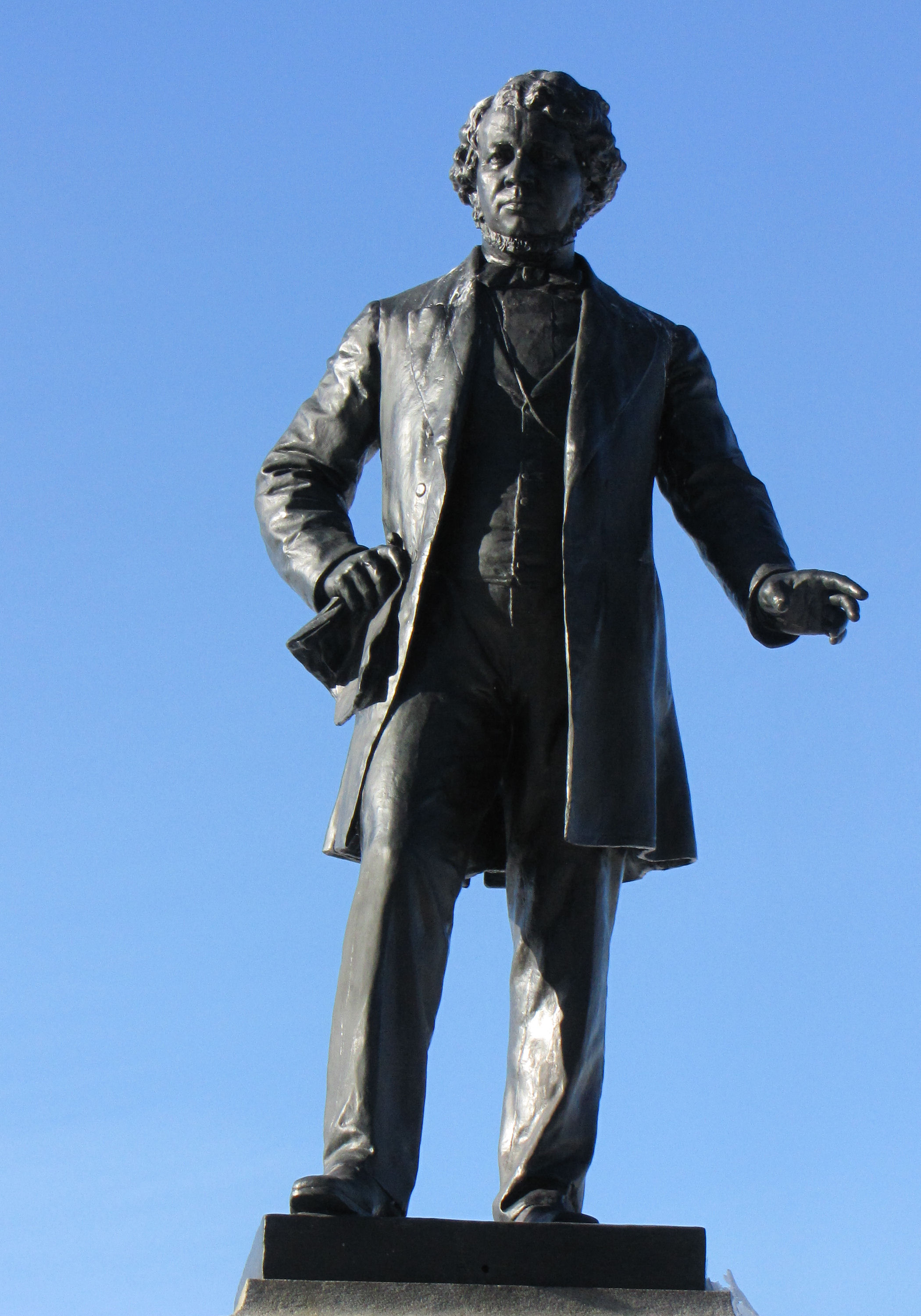
A statue of McGee on Parliament Hill, Ottawa

In 1857, he set up the publication of the New Era in Montreal, Quebec. In his editorials and pamphlets he attacked the influence of the Orange Order and defended the Irish Catholic right to representation in the assembly. In terms of economics he promoted modernisation, calling for extensive economic development by means of railway construction, the fostering of immigration, and the application of a high protective tariff to encourage manufacturing. Politically active, he advocated a new nationality in Canada, to escape the sectarianism of Ireland. In 1858, he was elected to the Legislative Assembly of the Province of Canada and worked for the creation of an independent Canada. McGee earned a law degree at McGill University and was called to the bar in 1861.

McGee became the minister of agriculture, immigration, and statistics in the Conservative government which was formed in 1863. He retained that office in the Great Coalition, and was a Canadian delegate to the Charlottetown and Quebec conferences of 1864. At Quebec, McGee introduced the resolution which called for a guarantee of the educational rights of religious minorities in the two Canadas.

=== Fenians ===
Moderating his radical Irish nationalist views, McGee denounced the Fenian Brotherhood in America that advocated a forcible takeover of Canada from Britain by the United States. Following Canadian Confederation, McGee was elected to the 1st Canadian Parliament in 1867 as a Liberal-Conservative representing the riding of Montreal West. However, he had lost much of his Irish Catholic support.

On 5 November 1867 McGee delivered an oration titled "The Mental Outfit of the New Dominion." The address surveyed the literary status of Canada on the eve of the first Dominion Parliament. McGee's views were a combination of Tory principle, revelation, and empirical method. He suggested a national literature inspired by the creativity and ingenuity of the Canadian people.

== Assassination ==
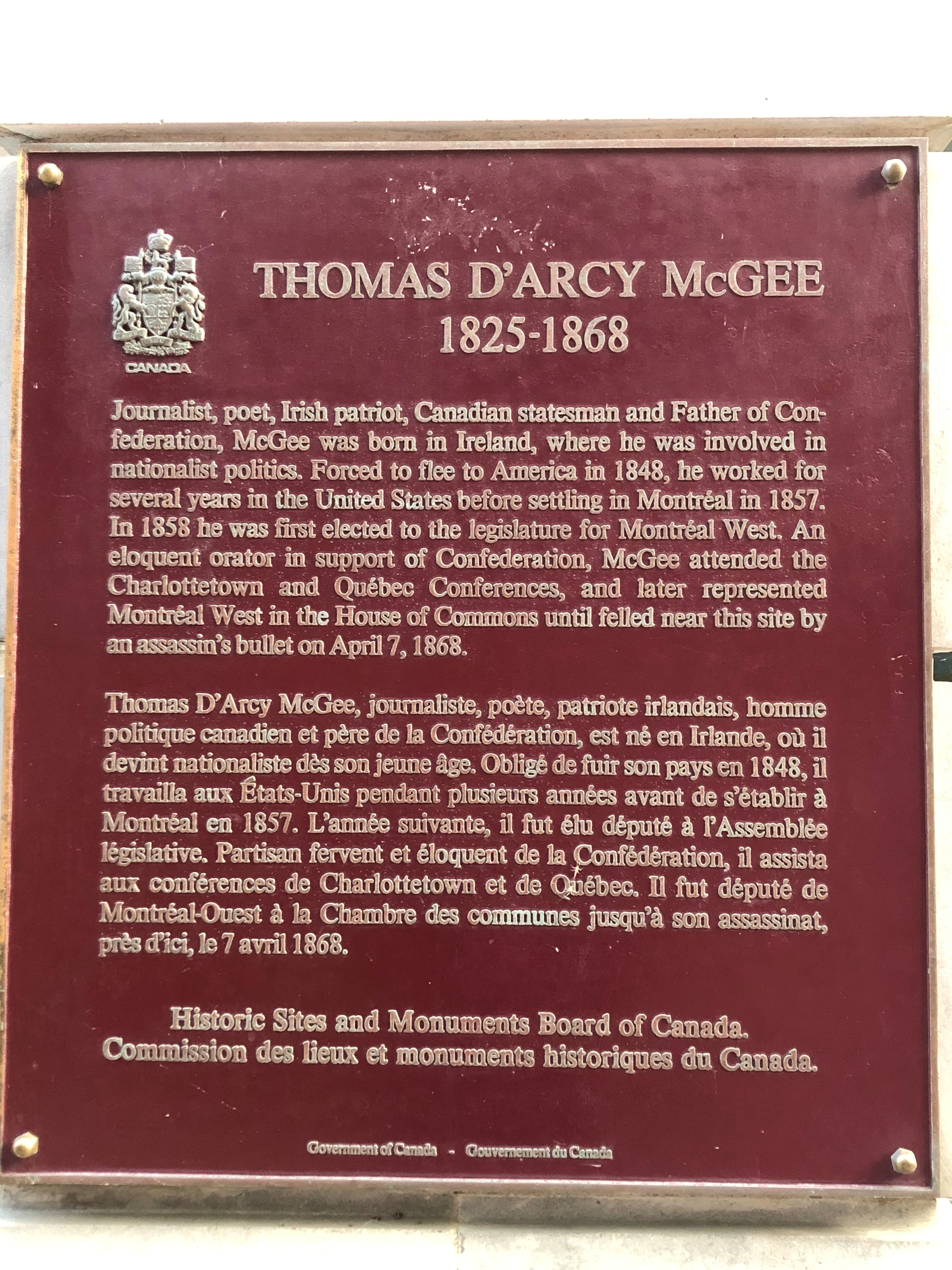
Plaque in English and French installed near the site of the assassination.

On 7 April 1868, McGee participated in a parliamentary debate that went on past midnight. After finishing, he walked back to the boarding house where he was staying. McGee was opening the door to Mrs. Trotter's Boarding House in Ottawa when he was shot in the head by someone waiting for him on the inside. Several people came running to the scene; however, there was no sign of the assassin. It was later determined that McGee had been assassinated with a shot from a handgun by Patrick J. Whelan.

McGee was given the first state funeral in Canada. His funeral in Ottawa was known to be one of the largest funerals in Canadian history, and his funeral procession in Montreal drew an estimated crowd of 80,000 out of a total city population of 105,000. He was interred in a crypt at the Notre Dame des Neiges Cemetery in Montreal.

Patrick J. Whelan, a Fenian sympathiser and a Catholic, was accused, tried, convicted, and hanged for the crime on 11 February 1869 in Ottawa. The jury was decisively swayed by the forensic evidence that Whelan's gun had been fired shortly before the killing, together with the circumstantial evidence that he had threatened and stalked McGee. Historian David Wilson points out that forensic tests conducted in 1972 show that the fatal bullet was compatible with both the gun and the bullets that Whelan owned. Wilson concludes:

The balance of probabilities suggests that Whelan either shot McGee, or was part of a hit-squad, but there is still room for reasonable doubt as to whether he was the man who actually pulled the trigger.

Conspiracy theorists questioned his guilt, suggesting that he was a scapegoat for a Protestant plot.

The government of Canada's Thomas D'Arcy McGee Building stands near the site of the assassination. A commemorative plaque has been installed at 138 Sparks Street by the Historic Sites and Monuments Board of Canada.

The case is dramatised in the Canadian play Blood on the Moon by Ottawa actor/playwright Pierre Brault. Patrick J. Whelan was hanged in front of an audience of 5,000 people. The assassination of McGee is also a major component of Away, a novel about Irish immigration to Canada by Canadian novelist Jane Urquhart.

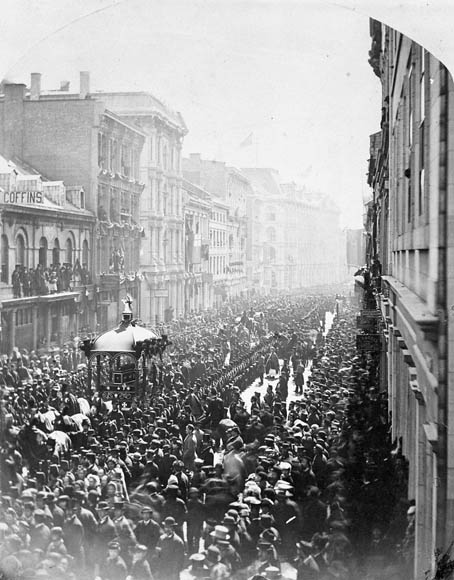
McGee funeral procession in 1868

== Impact of the assassination ==
P. M. Toner argues that the assassination was an important historical marker in Irish-Canadian history. He argues that the Fenian element among the Canadian Catholic Irish was powerful in the 1860s. The reasons for Fenian influence included McGee's failure to rally moderate Irish support before his death, and the fact that no convincing moderate leader replaced McGee after his death.

In addition the Catholic bishops proved unable to control the Fenians in either the US or Canada. A final factor explaining the influence of the Fenians was the courting of the Irish Catholic vote by Canadian non-Catholic politicians. Behind all these reasons was Canadian fear of the 'Green Ghost': American Fenianism. After 1870, the failure of American Fenian raids into Canada, followed by the collapse of American Fenianism, led to the decline of Canadian Fenian power.

== Honours ==
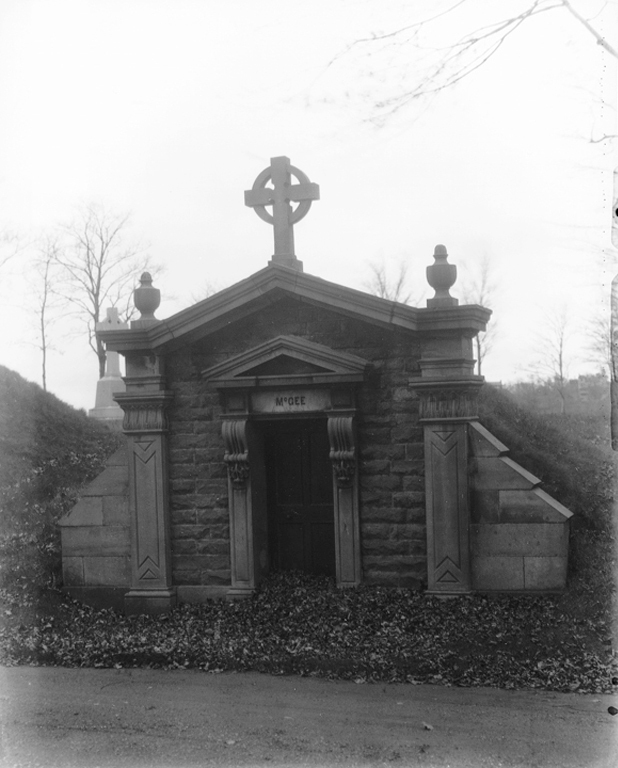
McGee's mausoleum in Notre-Dame-des-Neiges Cemetery, Montreal, 1927

A monument to McGee stands at Tremone Bay, in north County Donegal, Ireland near the bay from which he escaped to North America in 1848. There is a monument to him in his native Carlingford, County Louth, unveiled during a visit in 1991 by then Prime Minister of Canada Brian Mulroney and Irish Taoiseach Charles Haughey. His parents' grave in the grounds of Wexford's historic Selskar Abbey is marked by a plaque presented by the government of Canada.

On 20–22 August 2012, the inaugural Thomas D'Arcy McGee Summer School was held in Carlingford, County Louth, Ireland to commemorate and celebrate his legacy.

On Sparks Street, in downtown Ottawa, the Thomas D'Arcy McGee Building is a prominent government-owned office building. D'Arcy McGee's Pub stands on the corner of Sparks and Elgin streets.

McGee also has several schools named in his honour including:

- D'Arcy McGee Catholic School (elementary, Toronto Catholic District School Board, Toronto, Ontario);
- Thomas D'Arcy McGee Catholic School (elementary, Ottawa-Carleton Catholic School Board, Ottawa, Ontario);
- D'Arcy McGee High School, Western Quebec School Board (Aylmer, Quebec);
- Thomas D'Arcy McGee Catholic High School in Montreal (closed in 1992).

The Quebec provincial electoral district (riding) of D'Arcy-McGee is named in his honour, as well as two villages in central Saskatchewan: D'Arcy and McGee, located approximately 20 kilometres apart.

In 1986, a Chair of Irish Studies was set up in his honour at Saint Mary's University, Halifax. In 2005, the gun that was used to assassinate McGee was purchased at auction for $105,000 by the Canadian Museum of Civilization.

== Electoral history ==
1867 Canadian federal election: Montreal West
Party	Candidate	Votes
Liberal–Conservative	Thomas D'Arcy McGee	2,676
Liberal	Bernard Devlin	2,477
Source: Canadian Elections Database

1867 Ontario general election: Prescott
Party	Candidate	Votes	%
Liberal	James P. Boyd	838	50.67
Conservative	Thomas D'Arcy McGee	816	49.33
Total valid votes		1,654	82.78
Eligible voters		1,998	
Liberal pickup new district.			
Source: Elections Ontario

== Sources ==
- Wilson, David A. (2011). Thomas D'Arcy McGee: Volume 2: The Extreme Moderate, 1857–1868. McGill-Queen's University Press. ISBN 978-0-7735-3903-7.
