= Hypertension (journal) =

- Discipline: Hypertension
- Language: English
- Edited by: Rhian M. Touyz

Publication details
- History: 1979-present
- Publisher: Lippincott Williams & Wilkins on behalf of the American Heart Association
- Frequency: Monthly
- Open access: Hybrid, delayed, after 12 months
- Impact factor: 10.190 (2020)

Standard abbreviations
- ISO 4: Hypertension

Indexing
- CODEN: HPRTDN
- ISSN: 0194-911X (print); 1524-4563 (web)
- LCCN: 80645000
- OCLC no.: 4798824

Links
- Journal homepage; Online archive

Hypertension is a monthly peer-reviewed scientific journal that was established in 1979. It is published on behalf of the American Heart Association by Lippincott Williams & Wilkins. The editor-in-chief is Rhian M. Touyz. The journal publishes original manuscripts, invited review summaries, invited case-based reviews, recent study highlights, invited brief commentaries, scientific or technical tutorials, letters to the editor, and novel findings of unusual interest. It covers all aspects of research on hypertension, including pathophysiology, blood pressure regulation, clinical treatment, and prevention.

== Abstracting and indexing ==
The journal is abstracted and indexed in:

- Biological Abstracts
- BIOSIS Previews
- CAB Abstracts
- Chemical Abstracts Service
- CINAHL
- Current Contents/Clinical Medicine
- Current Contents/Life Sciences
- Embase
- Index Medicus/MEDLINE/PubMed
- PASCAL
- Science Citation Index
- Scopus

According to the Journal Citation Reports, the journal has a 2020 impact factor of 10.190.
