= Mary Rose McGee =

American politician

Mary Rose McGee (August 17, 1917 – March 5, 2004) was an American politician from New York. She was the first woman elected to the New York State Assembly from Long Island.

== Life ==
She was born Mary Rose Grasher on August 17, 1917, in Kansas City, Missouri. She moved to Bayside, Queens early in her life and moved to Huntington, Suffolk County, New York, in 1949. She married Francis Patrick McGee, had three children, and later got divorced.

Mary Rose McGee entered politics as a Democrat, and was Town Clerk of Huntington from 1967 to 1976. She was a member of the New York State Assembly in 1977 and 1978. In November 1978, she ran for re-election, but was defeated by Republican Toni Rettaliata.

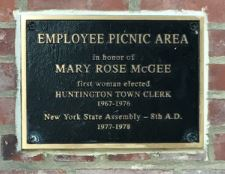
Mary Rose McGee Commemorative Plaque

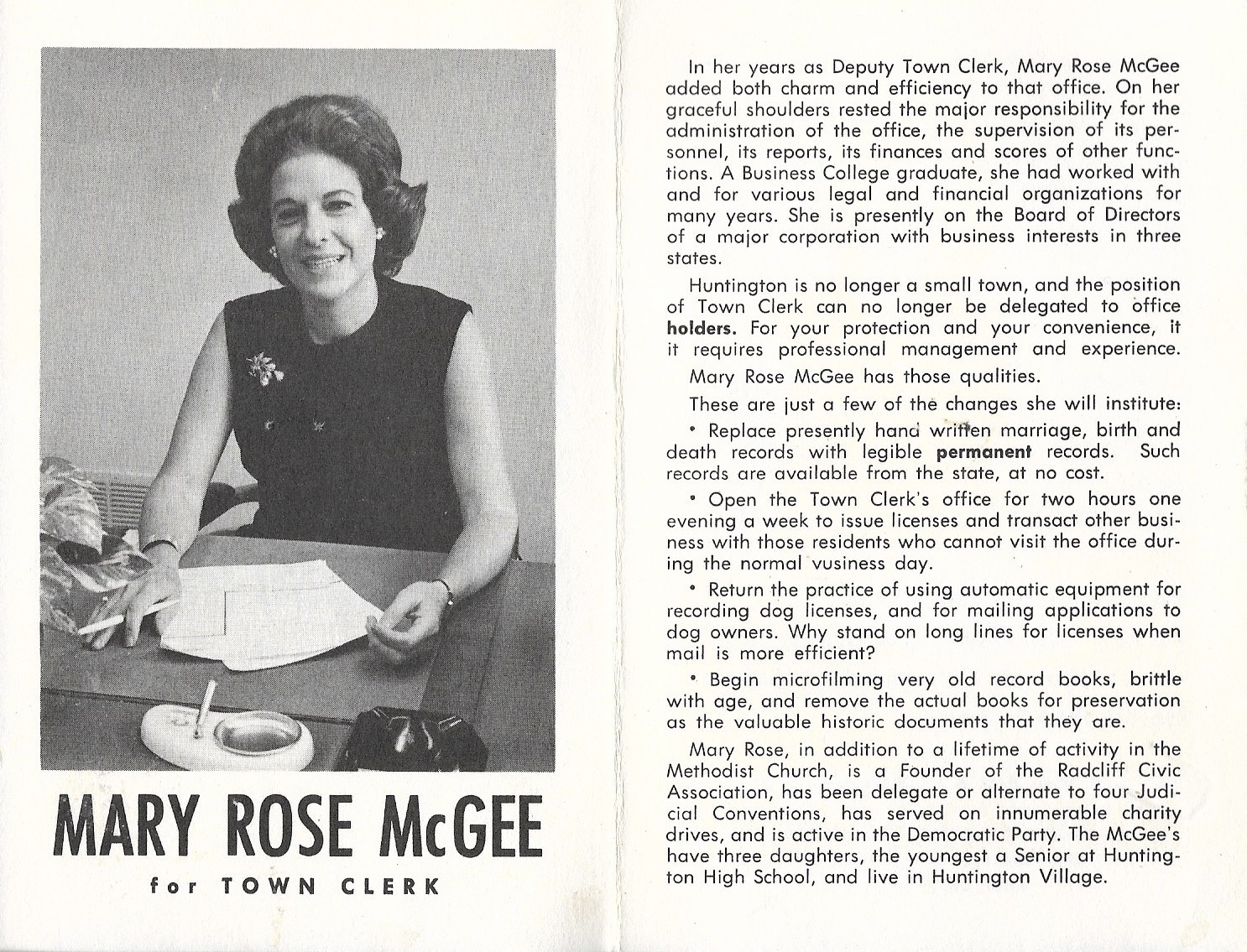
Mary Rose McGee Campaign Literature

Mary Rose McGee died on March 5, 2004. A commemorative plaque honoring her achievements stands outside of the employee picnic area at the Huntington Town Hall.

New York State Assembly
Preceded by Regis B. O'Neil, Jr.	New York State Assembly; 8th District; 1977–1978	Succeeded by Toni Rettaliata
