= Charles McGee =

Charles McGee may refer to:

- Charles McGee (painter) (1924–2021), American artist
- Charles McGee (pilot) (1919–2022), one of the Tuskegee Airmen; officer in the United States Air Force
- Charles McGee (politician), former executive director of the New Hampshire Republican Party, convicted of phone-jamming
