= List of University of Ottawa people =

This is a list of University of Ottawa people.

== Notable people ==
=== Athletes and leaders in sports ===
- Caleb Agada (born 1994), Nigerian-Canadian basketball player in the Latvian-Estonian Basketball League and for the Nigerian national basketball team
- Bianca Borgella, para-athlete
- James Cartwright, Olympic athlete (kayak)
- Michael A. Chambers, former president of the Canadian Olympic Committee and Olympic Order recipient
- Sonia Denoncourt, association football referee
- Doug Falconer, CFL football player, film producer
- Julia Hanes, para-athlete
- Brianna Hennessy, para-canoeist
- Lou Lefaive, Canadian sports administrator and civil servant
- Trinity Lowthian, wheelchair fencer
- Neil Lumsden, CFL football player
- Sherraine MacKay, Olympic athlete (épée fencing)
- Silver Quilty, Canadian Football Hall of Fame inductee
- Margot Shore, association football player
- Brad Sinopoli, CFL football player
- Miranda Smith, association football player
- Charles Thiffault (born 1939), NHL ice hockey coach
- Ibrahim Tounkara, CFL football player
- Ousmane Tounkara, CFL football player

=== Business leaders ===
- France Chrétien, prominent lawyer and businesswoman; daughter of former Prime Minister Jean Chrétien
- André Desmarais, President and CEO of Power Corp. Canada
- Paul Desmarais, entrepreneur
- Daniel Lamarre, president and chief operating officer of Cirque du Soleil
- Chuck Rifici, Canadian entrepreneur, former CEO of Tweed Marijuana Inc, and former CFO of the Liberal Party of Canada.
- Sherrexcia Rolle, Bahamian attorney and VP of Operations & General Counsel of Western Air

=== Civil servants and public sector leaders ===
- Johanne Bélisle, former Commissioner of Patents, Registrar of Trademarks and Chief Executive Officer of the Canadian Intellectual Property Office (CIPO)
- Jocelyne Bourgon, Canadian representative to the Organisation for Economic Co-operation and Development (OECD); former Clerk of the Privy Council
- William J. S. Elliott, former commissioner of the Royal Canadian Mounted Police
- Robert John Giroux, university president
- Ahmed Hussen, Federal Cabinet Minister and President of the Canadian Somali Congress
- Christiane Ouimet, first Public Sector Integrity Commissioner of Canada
- Sheridan Scott, Commissioner of Competition of the Competition Bureau
- Paul Tellier, former Clerk of the Privy Council

=== Journalists ===
- Aaron Badgley, music journalist and radio host
- Samantha Bee, host of Full Frontal with Samantha Bee
- Scott Burnside, journalist and sportswriter
- Marcel Desjardins, political commentator and news director
- Pierre Dufault, journalist and sports commentator for Radio-Canada
- Mary Lou Finlay, journalist for the CBC
- Peter Jennings, journalist and news anchor for ABC News
- Lisa LaFlamme, journalist
- Alex Trebek, former broadcaster for CBC, host of the game show Jeopardy!

=== Jurists ===
- Louise Arbour, Governor General of Canada, UN High Commissioner for Human Rights, and Justice of the Supreme Court of Canada
- Michel Bastarache, Justice of the Supreme Court of Canada
- Louise Charron, Justice of the Supreme Court of Canada
- Gérald Fauteux, former Chief Justice of the Supreme Court
- Louis LeBel, Justice of the Supreme Court
- Richard Wagner, Chief Justice of Canada

=== Musicians ===
- Joyce El-Khoury, opera singer
- Angela Hewitt, pianist
- Roch Voisine, singer-songwriter

=== Media personalities ===
- George Aryee, Director General of the Ghana Broadcasting Corporation (1991–1992)
- Randall Dark, director, producer, and HDTV pioneer
- Erica Ehm, television personality and songwriter, former MuchMusic VJ
- Jeanette Jenkins, Hollywood fitness trainer, spokeswoman for BET's Television foundation, "A Healthy BET Campaign"
- Suzanne Pinel, children's entertainer (Marie-Soleil)
- Quddus, model, MTV VJ

=== Natural scientists and engineers ===
- Xiaoyi Bao, professor, Canada Research Chair in Fiber Optics and Photonics
- Robert W. Boyd, physicist, Canada Excellence Research Chair Laureate in Quantum Nonlinear Optics
- Richard L'Abbé, engineer
- Timothy C. Lethbridge, professor of computer science and software engineering
- Yashpal Singh Malik, virologist
- Tuncer Őren, professor emeritus of computer science
- Tito Scaiano, professor of chemistry, photochemist
- Dafydd Williams, astronaut

=== Physicians and other health care professionals ===
- Mark Aubry, Chief Medical Officer of Hockey Canada, and the International Ice Hockey Federation
- Anna Baranowsky, clinical psychologist; founder and CEO of the Traumatology Institute
- Margaret Beznak, physiologist
- Dave Holmes, University Research Chair in Forensic Nursing; Editor-in-Chief of Aporia – the Nursing Journal
- Wilbert Joseph Keon, cardiovascular surgeon, first Canadian to implant an artificial heart in a human
- Padmaja Subbarao, respirologist and scientist in physiology and experimental medicine
- Philip Steven Wells, hematologist, developed the Wells risk score for pulmonary embolism and deep vein thrombosis

=== Political leaders ===
- Philémon Yunji Yang, Former Cameroon Prime minister

==== Federal and international ====
- Abdiweli Sheikh Ahmed, former Prime Minister of Somalia
- Bernard Chidzero, former Finance Minister of Zimbabwe
- Ousainou Darboe, former Vice-President of the Gambia
- Greg Fergus, 38th Speaker of the House of Commons, Member of Parliament
- Salter Hayden, Senator and lawyer
- Rahim Jaffer, former Canadian Member of Parliament
- John Manley, former Canadian Deputy Prime Minister and Minister of Finance
- Paul Martin, former Prime Minister of Canada
- Gabriela Michetti, former Vice President of Argentina
- Sir Edward Morris, former Prime Minister of Newfoundland
- André Ouellet, former Minister and CEO and president of Canada Post
- Jean-Luc Pepin, politician, Cabinet minister
- John Richardson, Brigadier General in the Canadian Forces and Member of Parliament
- Pauline Rochefort, member of Parliament
- Allan Rock, former Minister of Justice, among other ministerial portfolios, Canadian Ambassador to the United Nations, President of the University of Ottawa
- Hugh Segal, politician and Senator
- Landon Pearson, Canadian senator and children's rights activist
- Melissa Lantsman, Member of Parliament for Thornhill (2021 - Present) and Co-Deputy Leader of His Majesty's Loyal Opposition

==== Provincial & Territorial ====
- Howard Hampton, former leader of the Ontario New Democratic Party
- Dalton McGuinty, former Premier of Ontario
- Paul Okalik, first premier of Nunavut
- Michael Connolly, former MLA for Calgary-Hawkwood
- Bernard Drainville, MNA for Lévis
- David Piccini (born 1988), politician, Ontario’s Minister of Labour, Immigration, Training & Skills Development

==== Municipal ====
- Bob Chiarelli, former mayor of the City of Ottawa
- Mathieu Fleury, former Ottawa City Councillor for Rideau-Vanier
- Jean-Paul L'Allier, former mayor of Quebec City
- Gérald Tremblay, former mayor of Montreal

=== Social scientists ===
- Merridee Bujaki, manager of Accounting Studies
- Michel Chossudovsky, economist and author
- Dimitri Kitsikis, geopolitician
- Anna Koutsoyiannis, economist
- Joel Westheimer, American-born professor at the University of Ottawa

=== Visual artists ===
- Rhonda Abrams, classically trained painter and video artist
- Jean-Marc Carisse, photographer, author and recipient of Library and Archives Canada Scholar Award
- Philippe Falardeau, Oscar-nominated director

=== Writers and literature experts ===
- Angèle Bassolé-Ouédraogo, Ivoirian poet
- Michel Marc Bouchard, playwright
- Cyril Dabydeen, author and Professor of English
- Andrew Donskov, professor of modern languages, Tolstoy expert
- Faisal Kutty, lawyer, writer, human rights activist, academic teaching at Osgoode Hall Law School and at Valparaiso University
- Angela Narth, children's author
- Carol Shields, Pulitzer Prize–winning writer
- Kim Renders (BA in drama 1977), playwright, theatre director and actor; co-founder of Nightwood Theatre
- Christl Verduyn, professor of English Literature and Canadian Studies; recipient of the Governor General's International Award for Canadian Studies (2006)

== Governor General's Literary Awards ==
- Michel Bock, professor of history, Governor General's literary award winner

=== Other ===
- Abdul Rahman Jabarah, alleged al-Qaeda member killed in 2003
- Ahmed Khadr, alleged by Canada and the United States of being a "senior associate" and financier of al-Qaeda killed in Afghanistan in 2003
- Denis Rancourt, former physics professor, scientist, academic dissident

== Chancellors and presidents ==
=== List of chancellors ===
(1889–1965) University of Ottawa

- 1889–1909 Mgr Joseph-Thomas Duhamel
- 1911–1922 Mgr Charles-Hugues Gauthier
- 1922–1927 Mgr Joseph-Médard Émard
- 1928–1940 Mgr Joseph-Guillaume-Laurent Forbes
- 1940–1953 Mgr Alexandre Vachon
- 1953–1965 Mgr Marie-Joseph Lemieux, OP

(1965–present) University of Ottawa (reorganised)

- 1966–1973 The Right Honourable Pauline Vanier
- 1973–1979 The Right Honourable Gérald Fauteux
- 1979–1985 Gabrielle Léger
- 1985–1990 The Honourable Maurice Sauvé
- 1991–1993 Gordon F. Henderson
- 1994–2012 Huguette Labelle
- 2012–2015 The Right Honourable Michaelle Jean
- 2015–2022 Calin Rovinescu
- 2022–present: Claudette Commanda

=== List of presidents ===
(1848–1861) Le Collège de Bytown / The College of Bytown

- 1848–1849 Édouard Chevalier, OMI
- 1849–1850 Jean-François Allard, OMI
- 1850–1851 Napoléon Mignault, OMI
- 1851–1853 Augustin Gaudet, OMI
- 1853–1861 Joseph-Henri Tabaret, OMI

(1861–1889) Collège d'Ottawa / College of Ottawa

- 1861–1864 Joseph-Henri Tabaret, OMI
- 1864–1867 Timothy Ryan, OMI
- 1867–1874 Joseph-Henri Tabaret, OMI
- 1874–1877 Antoine Paillier, OMI
- 1877–1886 Joseph-Henri Tabaret, OMI
- 1886 Philémon Provost, OMI
- 1886–1887 Antoine Paillier, OMI
- 1887–1889 Jean-Marie Fayard, OMI

(1889–1965) Université d'Ottawa / University of Ottawa

- 1889–1898 James McGuckin, OMI
- 1898–1901 Henri-Antoine Constantineau, OMI
- 1901–1905 Joseph-Édouard Émery, OMI
- 1905–1911 William Murphy, OMI
- 1911–1914 Adrien-Bruno Roy, OMI
- 1914–1915 Henri Gervais, OMI
- 1915–1921 Louis Rhéaume, OMI
- 1921–1927 François-Xavier Marcotte, OMI
- 1927–1930 Uldéric Robert, OMI
- 1930–1936 Gilles Marchand, OMI
- 1936–1942 Joseph Hébert, OMI
- 1942–1946 Philippe Cornellier, OMI
- 1946–1952 Jean-Charles LaFramboise, OMI
- 1952–1958 Rodrigue Normandin, OMI
- 1958–1964 Henri-F. Légaré, OMI
- 1964–1965 Roger Guindon, OMI

(1965–present) Université d'Ottawa (nouvelle structure) / University of Ottawa (reorganised)

- 1965–1984 Roger Guindon, OMI
- 1984–1990 Antoine D'Iorio
- 1990–2001 Marcel Hamelin
- 2001–2008 Gilles G. Patry
- 2008–2017 Allan Rock
- 2017–2025 Jacques Frémont
- 2025–present Marie-Eve Sylvestre
