= List of alumni of Trent University =

A list of alumni of note from Trent University.

== Politics ==
- John Horgan, former Premier of British Columbia (2017-2022)
- Sheila Malcolmson, Minister of Mental Health and Addictions for British Columbia, and MLA for Nanaimo (2019-present)
- Nathan Cullen, Member of the Legislative of British Columbia (Stikine) 2020-2024, former Member of Parliament (Skeena-Bulkley Valley)
- Maryam Monsef, former Member of Parliament, Peterborough-Kawartha (2015-2021) and Minister of Status of Women in the 42nd Parliament of Canada,
- Dave Smith, Member of Provincial Parliament, Peterborough-Kawartha (2018-Present)
- Michelle Ferreri, Member of Parliament, Peterborough-Kawartha (2021-2025)
- Jeff Leal, former Member of Provincial Parliament (2003-2018) and Minister of Agriculture, Food, and Rural Affairs in the 41st Parliament of Ontario
- Chris Hodgson, former Ontario government cabinet minister
- Lucie Edwards, diplomat, Canadian High Commissioner to India, Kenya and South Africa; Ambassador in Nepal
- Stewart Wheeler, Ambassador to Iceland.
- Takako Suzuki, Japanese politician.

== Arts ==
- Yann Martel, writer (Life of Pi)
- Linwood Barclay, journalist and novelist
- Paul Boghossian, philosopher
- Gary Botting, poet, playwright, lawyer and legal scholar
- Tim Cook, historian and author
- Mani Haghighi, filmmaker
- Richard Harrison, poet
- B.A. Johnston, musician
- Christine Love, visual novelist
- Leah McLaren, writer
- James Motluk, filmmaker
- Paul Nicholas Mason, writer
- Stan Rogers, musician

== Business ==
- Darren Huston, Fmr. CEO of Priceline
- Don Tapscott, writer/futurist

== Media ==
- Stephen Stohn, entertainment lawyer and television producer (Degrassi franchise)
- Jason "Human Kebab" Parsons, member of the band Ubiquitous Synergy Seeker (USS)
- David McGuffin, CBC News, Africa correspondent
- Nancy Anne Sakovich, model, actress
- Ian Tamblyn, Juno Award-winning folk music singer-songwriter, record producer and playwright

== Religious ==
- Michael Mulhall, Bishop of Pembroke
- Peter Elliott, Dean of New Westminster, Vancouver

== Law ==
- Kofi Barnes - Judge of the Ontario Superior Court of Justice

== Medicine ==
- James Orbinski, Doctors without Borders, Nobel Prize winner

== Academia ==
- Christl Verduyn, Professor of English literature and Canadian Studies; recipient of the Governor General's International Award for Canadian Studies (2006)
- Ian K. Affleck, Professor of Physics and Astronomy at the University of British Columbia.
- Duane Rousselle, Professor of Sociology and Noted Psychoanalyst; recipient of the Governor General's Academic Medal

== Sports ==
- Leonid Urlichich, rally driver
