= Claude Couture =

Claude Couture is Professor of Social Sciences and Canadian Studies, Campus Saint-Jean, University of Alberta, since 1988. He was director of the Canadian Studies Institute of the University of Alberta from 2000 to 2010. He spent the 2004–2005 academic year as a Fulbright Professor at the Jackson School of the University of Washington in Seattle. He received the Rutherford Award for excellence in teaching from the University of Alberta in 2006, a Killam Professorship in 2007–2008, and the CAFA Distinguished Academic Award in 2008. He was awarded the University Cup of the University of Alberta in 2009 and was Editor-in-chief of the International Journal of Canadian Studies from 2006 to 2014. Later in 2014, he was awarded the Governor General's International Award for Canadian Studies.

His research interests are in the area of intellectual and social history. He is the author or co-author of fifteen books including:

- Britannicité. Présence française dans l'Empire britannique au long XIXe siècle, Québec, Presses de l'Université Laval, 2020 (with Srilata Ravi);
- Sports, modernité, et réseaux impériaux. Nap Lajoie, Kumar Shri Ranjitsinhi, baseball et cricket au tournant du XXe siècle, Québec, Presses de l'Université Laval, 2017 (with Srilata Ravi);
- Imaginaires collectifs, interculturalisme et histoire : autour de l’oeuvre de Gérard Bouchard, Québec, PUL, 2014, (with Srilata Ravi);
- Vingt ans après Charlottetown. L'ordre libéral colonial au Canada, Québec, Presses de l'Université Laval, 2013;
- La nation et son double. Essais sur les discours postcoloniaux au Canada, Québec, PUL, 2012;
- Tisser des liens entre Canadiens, Québec, PUL, 2011;
- Récits du XIXème du siècle. Structure et contenu du discours historiographique au Canada au XIXe siècle, Québec, PUL, 2009;
- Discours d'Étienne Parent, Montréal, Presses de l'Université de Montréal, 2000;
- Pierre Elliott Trudeau, Etienne Parent and Canadian Liberalism, Edmonton, University of Alberta Press, 1998;
- Espace et différences. Histoire du Canada, Québec, PUL, 1996.
- Le mythe de la modernisation du Québec. Des années 1930 à la Révolution tranquille, 1993;

He has also published extensively in academic journals and chapters in edited books.
