= Laura Huey =

Canadian criminologist

- Born: 1966 (age 59–60)
- Citizenship: Canadian

Academic background
- Education: Simon Fraser University (BA); University of British Columbia (MA, PhD)

Laura Huey (born 1966) is a Canadian criminologist specialising in the study of public policing, victimization, missing persons and mental health issues in criminal justice.

Huey is a professor at the University of Western Ontario in the department of sociology. She is also the editor-in-chief of the international journal Police Practice & Research, Chair of the Working Group on Mental Health and Policing of the COVID-19 Taskforce of the Royal Society of Canada, former vice-chair of the American Society of Criminologists' division of policing and the former executive director of the Canadian Society of Evidence Based Policing. She is also a member of the College of New Scholars, Artists and Scientists of the Royal Society of Canada and a senior research fellow with the National Police Foundation.

== Career ==
=== Research on policing ===
A significant focus of Huey's research is the politics of policing. Her first book, Negotiating Demands: The Politics of Skid Row Policing in Edinburgh, San Francisco and Vancouver, draws on field-based research to comparatively examine "the influence of local political, moral, and economic issues on police practices within marginalized communities" within three 'liberal', yet very different types of 'liberal' cities. While the political aspects of policing remained a research interest in the period that followed, it wasn't until 2022 that she released another book in this area. The Wicked Problems of Police Reform in Canada draws on twenty years of empirical data to present the public policy issues associated with the politics surrounding public police reform. Her current project continues to explore this interest but within the context of public order policing: #OccupyOttawa: An Oral History.

Throughout much of the period from 2015 to 2020, Huey's research and community engagement activities were focused on promoting evidence-based policing in Canada. In 2014, Huey was asked to sit as a member of the Canadian Council of Academies' expert panel on the future of Canadian policing. This panel was convened by Public Safety Canada in response to tri-partite agreement between federal territorial and provincial governments to explore maintaining or reducing policing costs. Recognizing a lack of sound Canadian policy-oriented research to address policing issues, in 2015 Huey founded the Canadian Society of Evidence Based Policing (Can-SEBP) and began to work with applied researchers and police organizations to try to increase the volume of research being produced. When she stepped down as Can-SEBP's director in 2020, this network of academics and policing practitioners had grown to over 3,000 members. Huey is also the co-author of two books in this field: Implementing Evidence Based Research: A How to Guide for Police Organisations and Evidence Based Policing: An Introduction to Key Ideas.

=== Research on victimisation ===
Following her Master's and Doctorate research into public and private policing within marginalized communities, Huey spent most of the early years of her career exploring criminal victimization of homeless citizens. Much of this work focused on two inter-related areas: the victimization of impoverished women and police responses to these crimes.

The dominant theme in two of Huey's books from this period is the profound lack of recognition of the nature and extent to which homeless women are victims of violence, and how ill-equipped current social and healthcare systems are to deal with the complex trauma that follows. In Becoming Strong: Impoverished Women and the Struggle to Overcome Violence, Huey and co-author Ryan Broll place this issue front and center in an analysis that draws on interviews from over two hundred impoverished women in three major U.S. cities. Relatedly, Adding Insult to Injury: (Mis)Treating Homeless Women in Our Mental Health System takes aim at the medicalization of impoverished women's suffering within social and healthcare settings. Huey and Ricciardelli argue for a trauma-informed approach to assisting women who are facing multiple issues, including the after-effects of significant violence.

Invisible Victims: Homelessness and the Growing Security Gap extends Huey's previous research into public policing and the provision of security within marginalized communities. Running counter to the academic trend to argue for less or no public policing within homeless and other economically disenfranchised communities, Huey argues that security – both physical and ontological – is both a civil right and a fundamental human right of all citizens. Drawing on her research over the preceding ten years, she maps out the ways in which the security needs of homeless citizens are neglected by policymakers and others and offers recommendations for a radical re-thinking of this issue.

=== Research into missing persons ===
Huey has written extensively on issues related to missing persons in Canada, primarily drawn from research using police data to explore both routine and unique aspects of missing persons cases to better identify the types of situations in which people are most and least likely to be reported missing. In 2019 she was asked to participate in the Independent Civilian Review into Missing Persons Investigations (the Epstein report). The result was an assessment of the available research on Canadian missing persons. After identifying only 16 studies that met her criteria, Huey concluded:

- the number of available Canadian studies is too low to be of use;
- the quality of much of the work in this area is not high;
- none of the papers identified provides useful insights into 'what works' to reduce or respond to missing persons calls; and
- the few topics and themes are too narrowly focused to either provide insights into general patterns or a sound empirical base for moving in any one direction.

=== Research into mental health ===
In 2020, Huey was asked to sit as the chair of a newly formed working group on Mental Health and Policing as part of the Royal Society of Canada's COVID-19 Taskforce. The group produced two working papers. In Volume I, Huey and colleagues identified several of the challenges facing researchers, police and policymakers in relying on police data to draw useful observations to inform policy or practice. Among their recommendations: provincial data capturing standards, improved data sharing practices and investments in improving the ability of Indigenous police services to collect and share data. In Volume II, the working group focused on providing evidence assessments for different types of police interventions involving individuals with mental illness. These assessments covered topics such as police co-response models, mental health screening tools, non-escalation and de-escalation training and situation tables.

In 2022 Huey and colleagues released a book, Policing Mental Health: Public Safety and Crime Prevention in Canada. Within it, they document the range of calls involving people with mental health issues, from missing persons and suicide-related calls to car accidents and noise disturbances.
