= Findicator =

Finnish online service

Findicator (Finnish: Findikaattori, Swedish: Findikator) was an online service providing up-to-date statistical information on the progress of Finland with about 100 indicators describing various aspects of society. The service was trilingual: all material was available in English, Finnish and Swedish. The graphs and tables of the service were automatically updated from a database as new information was published by governmental data producers.

Findicator was developed in a joint effort by Statistics Finland and the Finnish Prime Minister's Office. Its goal was to improve the availability and accessibility of indicator-type statistical data. Prime Ministers Matti Vanhanen and Jyrki Katainen endorsed the service.

OECD Public Governance Review wrote that the Finnish government is exploring through the Findicator initiative how it can establish indicators for desired societal outcomes and relay these to the public administration and to society in general. Clerk of the Privy Council Jocelyne Bourgon stated that from an international perspective, Finland has made significant progress in creating a national societal reporting system by introducing the Findicator service.

Findicator was developed and the indicators selected in cooperation with users and producers of statistical data, such as politicians and their assistants. The service was discontinued in 2022.

== See also ==
- Official statistics
