= Shortliffe =

Shortliffe is a surname. Notable people with this surname include:

- Edward H. Shortliffe (born 1947), Canadian-born American biomedical informatician, physician, and computer scientist
- Glen Shortliffe (1937–2010), Canadian diplomat, civil servant, businessman, and Clerk of the Privy Council
