= Christl Verduyn =

Canadian academic (born 1953)

Christl Verduyn CM FRSC (born 1953) is Professor of English Literature and Canadian Studies at Mount Allison University. She is the 2006 recipient of the Governor General's International Award for Canadian Studies, awarded by the International Council for Canadian Studies. She is cited in particular for the integration of her scholarship with the larger community and for exceptional contributions to the study of Canadian women's writing, in both English and French.

== Biography ==
Verduyn is a graduate of Trent University in Peterborough, Ontario. She received her MA and PhD in Quebec literature from the University of Ottawa. She is a former president (2002) of the Association for Canadian Studies. Her published scholarship includes a number of edited collections of significant correspondence or articles, including Asian Canadian Writing: Beyond Autoethnography (with Eleanor Ty, Wilfrid Laurier University Press, 2008), Must Write: Edna Staebler's Diaries (Wilfrid Laurier University Press, 2005), Marian Engel: A Life in Letters (with Kathleen Garay, University of Toronto Press, 2004), Aritha van Herk: Essays on her Works (Guernica, 2001), Marian Engel's Notebooks (Wilfrid Laurier University Press, 1999), Lifelines: Marian Engel's Writings (McGill-Queen's University Press, 1995) and Dear Marian, Dear Hugh: The MacLennan-Engel Correspondence (University of Ottawa Press, 1995). She is also a widely published poet, including the collection Silt (Guernica, 2002).

In 2006, Verduyn was elected as a Fellow of the Royal Society of Canada.

Verduyn was appointed a Member of the Order of Canada in December 2017 "for her contributions to Canadian studies, notably as a professor and author, and for her commitment to making Canadian literature accessible to a broader audience."
