= Gordon Osbaldeston =

Canadian civil servant (1930–2019)

The Honourable Gordon Osbaldeston PC CC

Clerk of the Privy Council and Secretary to the Cabinet
- In office December 10, 1982 – August 11, 1985
- Prime Minister: Pierre Trudeau; John Turner; Brian Mulroney
- Preceded by: Michael Pitfield
- Succeeded by: Paul Tellier

Under-Secretary of State for External Affairs
- In office 1982
- Minister: Mark MacGuigan; Allan MacEachen
- Preceded by: Allan Gotlieb
- Succeeded by: Marcel Massé

Deputy Minister of Industry, Trade and Commerce
- In office 1976–1978
- Minister: Jean Chrétien; Jack Horner
- Preceded by: Gerald Stoner
- Succeeded by: Marshall A. Cohen

Secretary of the Treasury Board
- In office 1973–1976
- Minister: Charles Drury; Jean Chrétien; Bob Andras
- Preceded by: Albert Wesley Johnson
- Succeeded by: Maurice LeClair

Deputy Minister of Consumer and Corporate Affairs
- In office 1972–1973
- Minister: Bob Andras; Herb Gray
- Preceded by: James Grandy
- Succeeded by: Michael Pitfield

Personal details
- Born: April 29, 1930 Hamilton, Ontario
- Died: March 6, 2019 (aged 88) London, Ontario
- Education: St. Michael's College, Toronto; University of Western Ontario

Gordon Francis Joseph Osbaldeston PC CC (April 29, 1930 – March 6, 2019) was a Canadian civil servant.

== Early life ==
Born in Hamilton, Ontario, he received a Bachelor of Commerce from the University of Toronto in 1952 and a Master of Business Administration from the University of Western Ontario in 1953. He was the gold medalist at St. Michaels College, the University of Toronto and the gold medalist at the Ivey School of Business, University of Western Ontario. He has received honorary degrees of Doctor of Laws from the University of Western Ontario (1984), York University(1984), Dalhousie University(1985), and Carleton University (1987).

In 1981 he was made an Officer of the Order of Canada and was promoted to Companion in 1997.

In 1953, he married Geraldine Margaret Keller of Kitchener, Ontario (deceased). They have four children Stephen, David, Robert and Catherine.

He joined the public service of Canada in 1953. He was posted to São Paulo, Brazil, Chicago, Illinois and Los Angeles, California as a Canadian Government Trade Commissioner. On return to Ottawa in 1964, he served consecutively as Assistant Director, Personnel, Assistant Director, Planning and Executive Director of the Canadian Government Trade Commissioner Service. In 1968, he was appointed Assistant Deputy Minister of the newly formed Department of Consumer and Corporate Affairs. In 1970, he was appointed Deputy Secretary of the Treasury Board in charge of the Program branch. From 1972 to 1973, he was Deputy Minister of the Department of Consumer and Corporate Affairs. From 1973 to 1976, he was Deputy Minister of the Treasury Board. From 1976 to 1978, he was Deputy Minister of the Department of Industry, Trade and Commerce. In 1978, he was appointed Secretary, Minister of State for Economic Development. In 1982, he was Under-Secretary of State for External Affairs. From 1982 to 1985, he was the Clerk of the Privy Council and Secretary to the Cabinet. As such, he served three Prime Ministers, namely, the Right Honourables Pierre Elliott Trudeau, John Turner, and Brian Mulroney.

In 1986, he joined the faculty of the Ivey School of Business and in 1995 he was appointed as a Professor Emeritus.

In 1981, he received the Outstanding Achievement Award of the Public Service. In 1990, he received the Vanier Medal from the Institute of Public Administration of Canada in recognition of outstanding contribution in the field of public administration. In 1977, he was awarded the Queen Elizabeth II Silver Jubilee Medal. In 1992, he was awarded the Commemorative Medal for the 125th anniversary of Canadian Confederation and in 2002, he was awarded The Queen Elizabeth II Golden Jubilee Medal and in 2012 he received the Queen Elizabeth II Diamond Jubilee Medal.

He has been a director of Atomic Energy of Canada Ltd., National Film Board of Canada, Export Development Corporation, Federal Business Development Bank, DeHavilland Aircraft Co., International Development Research Center, The Molson's Co. Ltd., Canada Packers Co. Ltd., DuPont Canada Ltd., Rockwell International Canada, National Bank of Canada, Bell Canada, London Medical Association, Bow Valley Energy Corp., Ellis-Don Ltd., Life Imaging Systems Inc., Great West Lifeco Inc., London Life Insurance Co., Canada Life Insurance Co., and Honorary Director of "Let's Talk Science".

He is the author of Keeping Deputy Ministers Accountable(1988) and Organizing to Govern (1992).

Osbaldeston died on March 6, 2019, in London, Ontario

== Honours ==

Ribbon	Description	Notes
	Order of Canada (CC)	Companion 17 April 1997; Officer 14 December 1981
	Queen Elizabeth II Silver Jubilee Medal	1977; Canadian Version of this Medal
	125th Anniversary of the Confederation of Canada Medal	1992
	Queen Elizabeth II Golden Jubilee Medal	2002; Canadian Version of this Medal
	Queen Elizabeth II Diamond Jubilee Medal	2012; Canadian Version of this Medal

- He was sworn in as a Member of the Queen's Privy Council for Canada on 13 February 1986 entitling him to the honorific The Honourable and the post-nominal letters "PC" for Life.
- He has received several Honorary degrees. These include

Honorary Degrees

Country	Date	School	Degree
Ontario	15 June 1984	University of Western Ontario	Doctor of Laws (LL.D)
Ontario	Spring 1984	York University	Doctor of Laws (LL.D)
Nova Scotia	1985	Dalhousie University	Doctor of Laws (LL.D)
Ontario	1987	Carleton University	Doctor of Laws (LL.D)
