= Paul Tellier =

Canadian politician

The Honourable Paul Tellier PC CC

President and Chief Executive Officer of Bombardier Inc.
- In office 2003–2004
- Succeeded by: Laurent Beaudoin

10th President and Chief Executive Officer of the Canadian National Railway
- In office 1992–2002
- Preceded by: Ronald E. Lawless
- Succeeded by: E. Hunter Harrison

Clerk of the Privy Council and Secretary to the Cabinet
- In office August 12, 1985 – June 30, 1992
- Prime Minister: Brian Mulroney
- Preceded by: Gordon Osbaldeston
- Succeeded by: Glen Shortliffe

Deputy Minister of Energy, Mines and Resources
- In office 1982–1985
- Minister: Jean Chrétien; Gerald Regan; Pat Carney
- Preceded by: Marshall A. Cohen
- Succeeded by: de Montigny Marchand

Deputy Minister of Indian Affairs and Northern Development
- In office 1979–1982
- Minister: Jake Epp; John Munro
- Preceded by: Arthur Kroeger
- Succeeded by: Maurice Lafontaine

Personal details
- Born: 1939 (age 86–87) Joliette, Quebec
- Relations: Sir Joseph-Mathias Tellier (grandfather); Louis Tellier (great-uncle)
- Parent: Maurice Tellier
- Education: University of Ottawa; Linacre College, Oxford
- Occupation: Businessman, civil servant, lawyer, former Corporate Director of Alcan, Bombardier, BCE Inc., Bell Canada, CN, Global Containers Terminals (Chairman), Manulife, McCain Foods, Petro Canada, RIO Tinto Ltd., RIO Tinto PLC, SNC Lavallin. Current Director of GM Canada, Harnois Groupe Petrolier

Paul Mathias Tellier, PC CC (born 1939) is a Canadian businessman and former public servant and lawyer.

== Biography ==
Born in Joliette, Quebec, Tellier earned his undergraduate degree from the University of Ottawa and his law degree from the University of Oxford. He entered Canada's civil service in the 1970s and rose through the ranks of the federal bureaucracy through several high-profile deputy minister portfolios, culminating as the nation's top civil servant from August 12, 1985 to June 30, 1992, when he was appointed Clerk of the Privy Council, in the Privy Council Office of Canada, during Brian Mulroney's ministry. Mulroney reduced Tellier's role as Clerk between 1986 and 1989, when he appointed Dalton Camp as his personal Deputy Minister.

In 1992, he left the civil service and was appointed by Mulroney as president and chief executive officer of the Crown corporation Canadian National Railway (CN). Tellier was a driving force behind the successful privatization of the company in 1995 and was widely seen as being the principal instigator behind CN's purchase of Illinois Central, which saw the company expand its focus from an exclusively east-west orientation into a north-south one. As such it was one of the first companies to reap the benefits of the North American Free Trade Agreement (NAFTA). Following a failed bid to merge CN with BNSF Railway in 2000, Tellier oversaw the purchase and integration of Wisconsin Central. He also was responsible for hiring a management team that focused on making CN a "scheduled" freight railway, largely by promoting former Illinois Central president Hunter Harrison to a vice-president position at CN.

In January 2003, Tellier stepped down from CN, (Harrison assumed the presidency of the company) to take a three-year posting as the president and CEO of Bombardier. This was largely seen in the Canadian business community as an attempt by Bombardier to turn itself around following several lacklustre years of growth in the aerospace and passenger rail vehicle markets. Tellier oversaw Bombardier and sold its recreational vehicle production to the Beaudoin family, Bombardier's majority shareholders. Tellier also made several major cuts in the workforce and attempted to adjust and refocus the company on its core business activities. On December 13, 2004, it was announced that Tellier was leaving Bombardier, after he told the company that he did not want to stay for the full three years of his contract. Tellier also serves as an executive on the board of directors of Bell Canada and Rio Tinto Alcan.

In 1992, he was made a Companion of the Order of Canada. In 2004, the second St. Clair Tunnel was named in his honor.

Since November 2006, Paul Tellier has served as joint chairman on the Prime Minister's Advisory Committee on the Public Service of Canada. This committee gives advice to the Prime Minister and the Clerk of the Privy Council on the renewal of the Public Service, with the objective of shaping it into an institution geared to excellence, distinguished by highly engaged and highly skilled people performing critical tasks with professionalism and efficiency.

In October 2007, he was appointed by Prime Minister Harper to a panel responsible for reviewing Canada's military mission in the War in Afghanistan.

Paul Tellier is the son of Maurice Tellier, and the grandson of Sir Joseph-Mathias Tellier, who was the brother of Louis Tellier. He is also a third cousin of Luc-Normand Tellier.

== See also ==
- Canadian National Railway
- Bombardier

== Notes ==
Business positions
| Preceded by Ronald E. Lawless | President of Canadian National Railway; 1992 – 2002 | Succeeded by E. Hunter Harrison |
| Preceded by | President of Bombardier; 2003 – 2004 | Succeeded by Laurent Beaudoin |
Awards
| Preceded by Robert D. Krebs (ATSF) and Gerald Grinstein (BN) | Railroader of the Year; 1997 | Succeeded by David R. Goode (NS) |
