= Marcel Hamelin =

Canadian historian

President of the University of Ottawa
- In office 1990–2001
- Preceded by: Antoine D'Iorio
- Succeeded by: Gilles G. Patry

Personal details
- Born: September 18, 1937 (age 89) Saint-Narcisse, Quebec, Canada
- Education: Laval University

Marcel Hamelin (born September 18, 1937) is a Canadian historian and a former president of University of Ottawa.

== Education ==
In 1961, Hamelin earned his Doctor of Letters in History from Laval University. Hamelin attended Séminaire Sainte-Marie in Shawinigan, Quebec.

== Career ==
Hamelin served as president of the University of Ottawa from 1990 to 2001. He is a member of the Royal Society of Canada.

In 1966, Hamelin joined the Faculty of Arts at the University of Ottawa, teaching and serving as chairman in the Department of History. He later held the positions of Vice-Dean of the School of Graduate Studies and Research and Dean of the Faculty of Arts from 1974 to 1990.

== Personal life ==
Hamelin married Judith Purcell on August 18, 1962 and has three children: Danielle, Christine and Marc

=== Legacy ===
The Arts building at the University of Ottawa is now named after him.
