= Huguette Labelle =

Canadian civil servant and university chancellor

Huguette Labelle CC OOnt
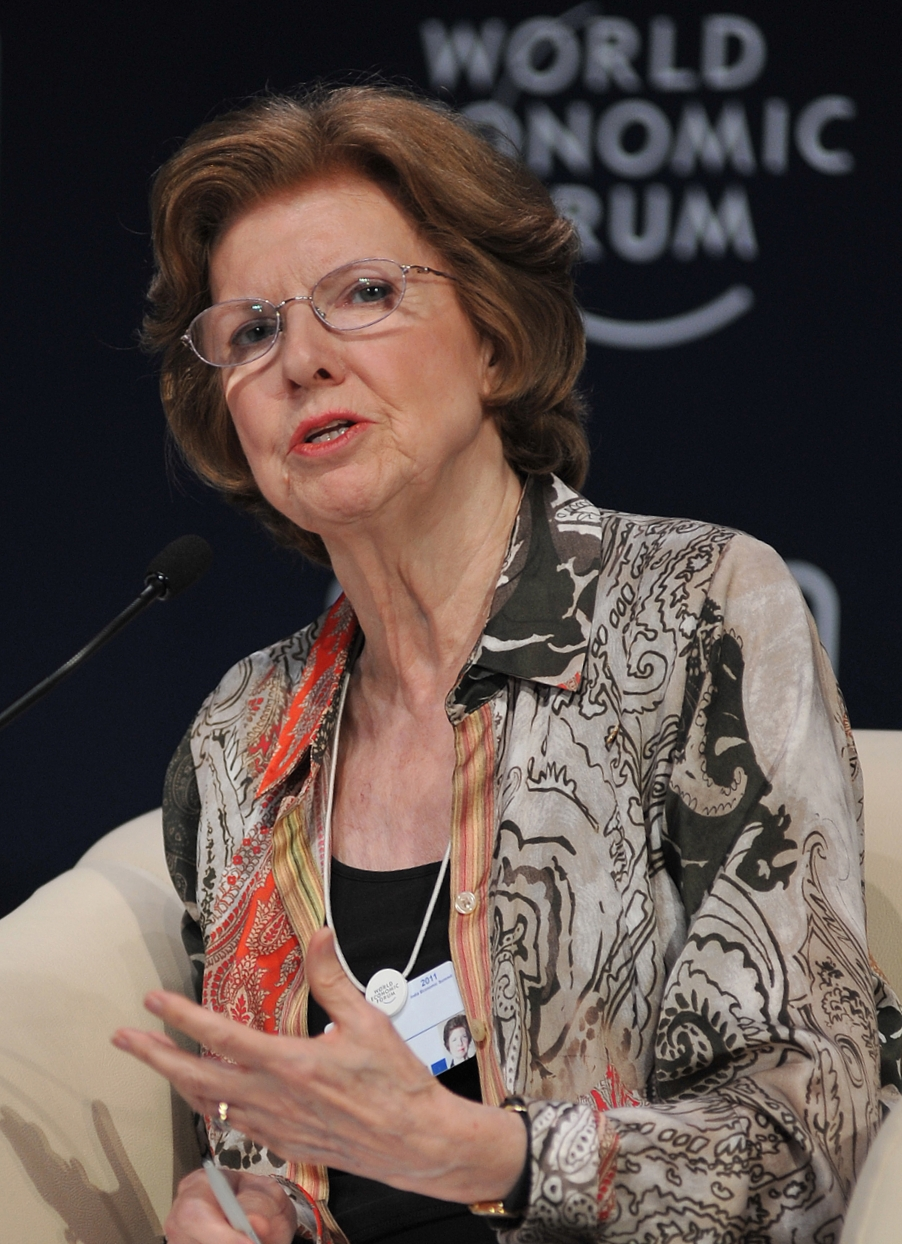
- Huguette Labelle at the 2011 World Economic Forum India Economic Summit

President of the Canadian International Development Agency
- In office 1993–1999
- Preceded by: Jocelyne Bourgon

Deputy Minister of Transport
- In office 1990–1993
- Minister: Doug Lewis; Jean Corbeil
- Preceded by: Glen Shortliffe
- Succeeded by: Jocelyne Bourgon

Chairperson of the Public Service Commission of Canada
- In office 1985–1990
- Preceded by: Edgar Gallant
- Succeeded by: Robert J. Giroux

Deputy Clerk of the Privy Council and Associate Secretary to the Cabinet
- In office 1985
- Clerk: Gordon Osbaldeston

Under-Secretary of State for Canada
- In office 1980–1985
- Minister: Francis Fox; Gerald Regan; Serge Joyal; Walter McLean
- Preceded by: Pierre Juneau
- Succeeded by: Robert Rabinovitch

Personal details
- Born: April 15, 1939 (age 87) Rockland, Ontario
- Education: University of Ottawa
- Occupation: Civil servant

Huguette Labelle CC OOnt (born April 15, 1939) is a Canadian retired civil servant and former Chancellor of the University of Ottawa, serving from 1994 until 2012. She has been the chair of the Independent Advisory Board for Senate Appointments since 2016.

Born in Rockland, Ontario, she received a Master of Education and Doctor of Philosophy in education from the University of Ottawa.

From 1973 to 1980, she held senior management posts in the Department of Indian and Northern Affairs and in Health and Welfare Canada. From 1980 to 1985, she was Under Secretary of State for the Department of the Secretary of State. In 1985, she was Associate Secretary to the Cabinet and Deputy Clerk of the Queen's Privy Council for Canada. From 1985 to 1990, she was the chairperson of the Public Service Commission of Canada. From 1990 to 1993, she was the Deputy Minister of Transport.

From 1993 to 1999, she was the president of the Canadian International Development Agency. Labelle headed the Canadian delegation which participated in the first Tokyo International Conference on African Development in October 1993.

In 1998, she was the deputy head of the Millennium Bureau of Canada. She retired in 1999.

In 2002, she was appointed to the board of governors of the Canadian Centre for Management Development.

In 1994 she was appointed chancellor of the University of Ottawa, and served until 1 February 2012 when she was replaced by the Right Honourable Michaëlle Jean.

In November 2005, she was appointed chair of the board of directors of Transparency International.

On January 19, 2016, she was appointed to chair the Independent Advisory Board for Senate Appointments, to advise the prime minister on Senate appointments.

== Honours ==
- In 1989 she was made an Officer of the Order of Canada and was promoted to Companion in 2001.
- In 1993, she was awarded the Vanier Medal of the Institute of Public Administration of Canada, "awarded to a person who has shown distinctive leadership and accomplishment in Canadian public service".
- In 1998, she was presented with the Outstanding Achievement Award of the Public Service of Canada, "presented to senior public servants who have distinguished themselves by a sustained commitment to excellence".
- In 2001, she was made an Officer of the Ordre de la Pléiade, an order honouring achievement in La Francophonie.
- In 2001, she was promoted to Companion of the Order of Canada. U. of Ottawa Bio
- In 2005, she received the Order of Red Cross, Companion Level First Woman President of the Canadian Red Cross.
- In 2008, she was presented with the PRIX DE LA FONDATION in the framework of the Crans Montana Forum
- In 2011, she was made a Member of the Order of Ontario.
- She has received honorary degrees from the University of Notre Dame, Brock University, the University of Saskatchewan, Carleton University, the University of Ottawa, York University, Mount Saint Vincent University, the University of Windsor, University of Manitoba, Saint Paul University, and Saint Francis Xavier University.
- Mme Labelle at Transparency International
- Emeritus Governor at University of Ottawa

== Notes ==
1. Institute of Public Administration of Vanier Medal {dead link}
2. Outstanding Achievement Award of the Public Service of Canada{dead link}

Academic offices
Preceded by Gordon Henderson	Chancellor of the University of Ottawa; 1994 – 2012	Succeeded by Michaëlle Jean
