= Roger Guindon =

Canadian Catholic priest and academic (1920–2012)

Roger Guindon CC OOnt OQ
- Born: September 26, 1920; Ville-Marie, Quebec
- Died: November 17, 2012 (aged 92); Ottawa, Ontario
- Awards: Order of Canada; National Order of Quebec; Order of Ontario

Roger Guindon CC OOnt OQ (September 26, 1920 – November 17, 2012) was a Canadian priest and former university administrator.

Born in Ville-Marie, Quebec, he was ordained a priest in 1946. He joined the University of Ottawa as a Professor in the Faculty of Theology and later became Dean of the faculty. From 1964 to 1984 he was the Rector of the University of Ottawa. Roger Guindon served as the founding president of the Fondation franco-ontarienne from 1986 to 1992. His uncle, Auguste Morisset, was also a member of the faculty at the college, having been director of libraries from 1934 to 1958 and founder and director of the university's Library School from 1958 to 1971. It was under Guindon's rectorship that Morisset Hall, named for his uncle, was opened.

In 1968 he received an honorary Doctorate of Laws degree from Trent University. In 1973, he was made a Companion of the Order of Canada "in recognition of his contribution to the development of university teaching". In 1987, he was awarded the Order of Ontario. In 1996, he was made an Officer of the National Order of Quebec.

Guindon died on November 17, 2012. Roger Guindon Hall, the core of the medical campus of the University, was named in his honour in 1985.

Academic offices
Preceded by Henri-F. Légaré	Rector of the University of Ottawa; 1964–1984	Succeeded by Antoine d'Iorio
