= Glen Shortliffe =

Canadian diplomat

Clerk of the Privy Council and Secretary to the Cabinet
- In office July 1, 1992 – March 27, 1994
- Prime Minister: Brian Mulroney; Kim Campbell
- Preceded by: Paul Tellier
- Succeeded by: Jocelyne Bourgon

Deputy Clerk of the Privy Council and Associate Secretary to the Cabinet
- In office 1990–1992
- Prime Minister: Brian Mulroney

Deputy Minister of Transport
- In office 1988–1990
- Minister: Benoît Bouchard
- Preceded by: Ramsey Muir Withers
- Succeeded by: Huguette Labelle

Canadian Ambassador to Indonesia
- In office 1977–1979

Personal details
- Born: November 12, 1937 Edmonton, Alberta
- Died: May 4, 2010 (aged 72) Ottawa, Ontario
- Education: University of Alberta

Glen Scott Shortliffe (November 12, 1937 – May 4, 2010) was a Canadian diplomat, civil servant, businessman, and Clerk of the Privy Council.

== Biography ==
Born in Edmonton, Alberta, he received a Bachelor of Arts degree from the University of Alberta in 1960.

From 1977 to 1979, he was the Canadian Ambassador to Indonesia.

From 1979 to 1982, he was the Vice President Policy for the Canadian International Development Agency. From 1982 to 1990, he held positions as Associate Secretary to the Cabinet, Deputy Minister of Transport, and Deputy Secretary to the Cabinet/Operations .

In 1990 he was appointed Associate Secretary to the Cabinet and Deputy Clerk of the Privy Council.

From 1992 to 1994, he was the Clerk of the Privy Council and Secretary to the Cabinet.

In 1994, he co-founded the Sussex Circle consulting group.

He died May 4, 2010, in Ottawa at home.
