= Joseph-Henri Tabaret =

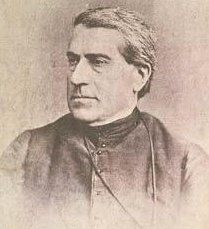
- Born: April 12, 1828; Saint-Marcellin, France
- Died: February 8, 1886 (aged 57); Ottawa, Ontario

Joseph-Henri Tabaret (12 April 1828 – 8 February 1886) was a French-born Roman Catholic Priest and academic, best known because of his long and important association with the University of Ottawa. He was a member of the Oblate Fathers of Mary Immaculate. The Oblates founded the College of Bytown in 1848. Under Tabaret's leadership from 1853–1861, Bytown College became an official university.

He was rector (president) of Collège d'Ottawa / College of Ottawa from 1861–1864, 1867–1874 and 1877–1886. Rev. Joseph-Henri Tabaret, OMI, served the College for a total of 30 years during the 19th century, and is generally regarded as the builder of the University. Father Tabaret was an ardent defender of bilingualism, often heard to say: "...in this part of Canada, the use of both languages is not a matter of discussion; it is a matter of necessity."

A statue of Tabaret is on display at the University of Ottawa in front of Tabaret Hall. In May 2024, the statue was vandalized with red-orange paint, with "Colonizer" written in black under the statue. The act was speculated to have been done by pro-Palestinian protestors on the campus, as the statue resides close to encampments set up by protestors, but it is currently unknown whether the action was performed by one.

Academic offices
Preceded by Augustin Gaudet	Rector of the College of Bytown/College of Ottawa; 1853–1864	Succeeded by Timothy Ryan
Preceded by Timothy Ryan	Rector of the College of Ottawa; 1867–1874	Succeeded by Antoine Paillier
Preceded by Antoine Paillier	Rector of the College of Ottawa; 1877–1886	Succeeded by Philémon Provost
