= Rhonda Abrams =

Canadian artist (born 1960)

- Born: Rhonda D. Abrams; 1960 (age 65–66); Montreal, Quebec
- Education: B.A. University of Ottawa; Banff Centre for Arts and Creativity School of Fine Arts; M.A. York University, Toronto
- Known for: painter, video artist

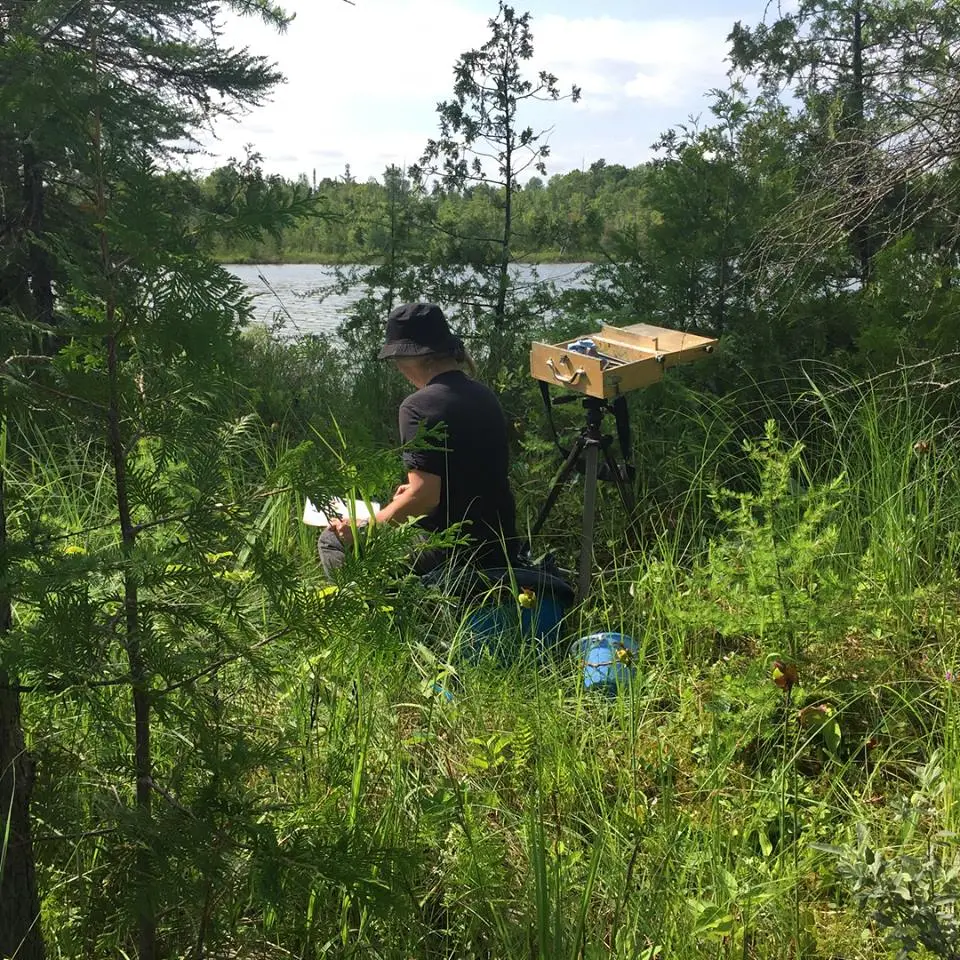

Rhonda D. Abrams (born 1960) is a classically trained painter and video artist who was born in Montreal, Canada.

== Career ==
Abrams attended the University of Ottawa and obtained a Bachelor of Arts from the school. After this, she continued her education studying at the Banff Centre for Arts and Creativity School of Fine Arts. She holds a Masters of Fine Arts from York University. She founded the Durham Art School, where she mentored artists for 10 years. She paints a variety of subjects, mostly working from life, and in a variety of mediums, in keeping with her restless personality.

She developed her skills in video and performance art, which she used in creating her 1985 piece, "Myth of the Fishes" and 1987 piece “Lament of the Sugar Bush Man”. Both pieces were also presented as live performance and convey emotion with original music and libretto.

"Lament of the Sugar Bush Man” reflects Abrams' care for the environment, which can also be seen through her paintings that accurately reflect any landscape she is immersed in. In her book Canadian Film and Video: A Bibliography and Guide to the Literature Volume 1, author Loren R. Lerner states that Abrams' work is "presented as an evocation of a vision of environmental desperation." Her work is included in the collections of the Museum of Modern Art and the National Gallery of Canada.
