= Jeanette Jenkins =

American fitness trainer

- Born: Hollywood, California, U.S.
- Education: BS in Human Kinetics
- Alma mater: University of Ottawa
- Occupation: Fitness Trainer
- Organization: The Hollywood Trainer LLC
- Known for: Fitness instruction books and methods of physical exercises
- Notable work: The Hollywood Trainer Weight-Loss Plan - 21 Days to Make Healthy Living a Lifetime Habit; 600 Calories in 60 Minutes Workout
- Website: https://thehollywoodtrainer.com/

Jeanette Jenkins is an American fitness trainer and author of The Hollywood Trainer Weight-Loss Plan - 21 Days to Make Healthy Living a Lifetime Habit book and of various training programs on fitness exercises and healthy eating. She is the founder of The Hollywood Trainer company, which also provides fitness programs and personal coaching for athletes, artists, and entertainers. Jeanette has appeared in training videos on social media, including YouTube, TikTok, Instagram and Facebook.

== Early life and education ==
Jeanette Jenkins was born in Hollywood, California, and grew up in Oshawa, Ontario, Canada. She earned a Bachelor of Science degree in Human Kinetics from the University of Ottawa in 1997.

Jenkins holds certifications in fields such as nutrition, weight training, kickboxing, pilates, yoga, and metabolic testing. She currently lives and works in Los Angeles, California.

== Career ==
Jenkins started her career as a trainer for the university's men's football team, addressing sports injuries.

Upon completion of her studies at the University of Ottawa in 1997, Jeanette moved to Los Angeles and began teaching fitness classes. Jeanette then founded her own fitness training company, The Hollywood Trainer LLC.

In 2001, she appeared on Season 1, Episode 3 of Fear Factor (Jet Ski to Helicopter/Eat Beetles/Rope Crawl). The episode aired on 06/25/2001.

Since then, Jenkins has been a personal training coach for many artists, including Pink, Kelly Rowland, Alicia Keys and Tracee Ellis Ross, among others.

She also had collaborations with Jurnee Smollett and Nia Long, and was enlisted as trainer by Olympic Gold Medalist Shawn Johnson. Jenkins bases her technique on measurements of body fat percentage, using two methods: bioelectrical impedance and with calipers. The Hollywood Trainer Club's programs include the 30-Day Butt Challenge and 10-Day Ab Blast Challenge and the Bikini Bootcamp.

Since 2007, Jeanette has published a book and created a series of fitness instruction videos, which have been translated into twelve different languages. She also launched “thehollywoodtrainerclub.com,” an online club, discussing fitness and healthy lifestyle;

Jenkins frequently has appeared as a fitness expert on topics such as fitness, nutrition and workout regimens in television programs "Good Morning America," and in outlets like ABC News, and People Magazine, as well as in her alma mater, the University of Ottawa. An advocate of contemporary fitness movement, called the Mindfulness Era, Jeanette is arguably considered among the first trainers in the fitness industry who encouraged people of color to be more involved as health and wellness practitioners, Jeanette is also known for starting fitness contests in social media platforms TikTok and YouTube, as well as Instagram and Meta. In 2020, her "600 calories in 60 minutes Challenge," a cardio-sculpting kickboxing workout posted on TikTok, became a viral hit, with over 15 million views.

Jeanette was part of the Nike Fitness as a Nike Training Club Ambassador and as a Nike Elite Athlete expert. She was also signed by Apple as a special guest fitness instructor for Fitness+. Aside from this, Jenkins co-created Apple's Health and Fitness Walk Program with Jay Blahnik.

As a volunteer UNICEF Kid Power coach, Jeanette collaborated with Pink, to motivate kids in the US to stay fit while raising donations for malnourished children around the world. She ran the 2016 NYC Marathon, her first marathon, in support of Keep a Child Alive, an organization co-founded by Alicia Keys. Since 2010, Jeanette has been an advocate of the "Samburu Project," donating a well in her family's name.

== Publications ==
- The Hollywood Trainer Weight-Loss Plan - 21 Days to Make Healthy Living a Lifetime Habit, (2007) by Putnam Adult. (Re-printed by Perigee Trade in 2009).

== List of workout videos ==
| Year released | Title | Fitness focus |
|---|---|---|
| 2020 | Sister Series Workouts | N/A |
| 2020 | 30 Day Total Body Bootcamp | N/A |
| 2015 | Bikini Bootcamp Vol. 2 | Aerobics and Toning |
| 2013 | Sexy Abs Cardio Workout | Aerobics and Toning |
| 2012 | Cardio Kickboxing | Cardio |
| 2011 | Sexy Abs | Core |
| 2010 | Power Yoga | N/A |
| 2010 | Blast the Belly Fat | Aerobics and Toning |
| 2009 | Bikini Bootcamp | Aerobics and Toning |
| 2008 | Sexy Arms and Legs | Aerobics and Training |
| 2008 | Crunch Super Charged Kickbox Party | Aerobics |
| 2007 | 21 Day Total Body Circuit Workout | Aerobics and Toning |
| 2007 | Core and Stretch it Out | Core |
