= Yashpal Singh Malik =

Indian Scientist/Researcher

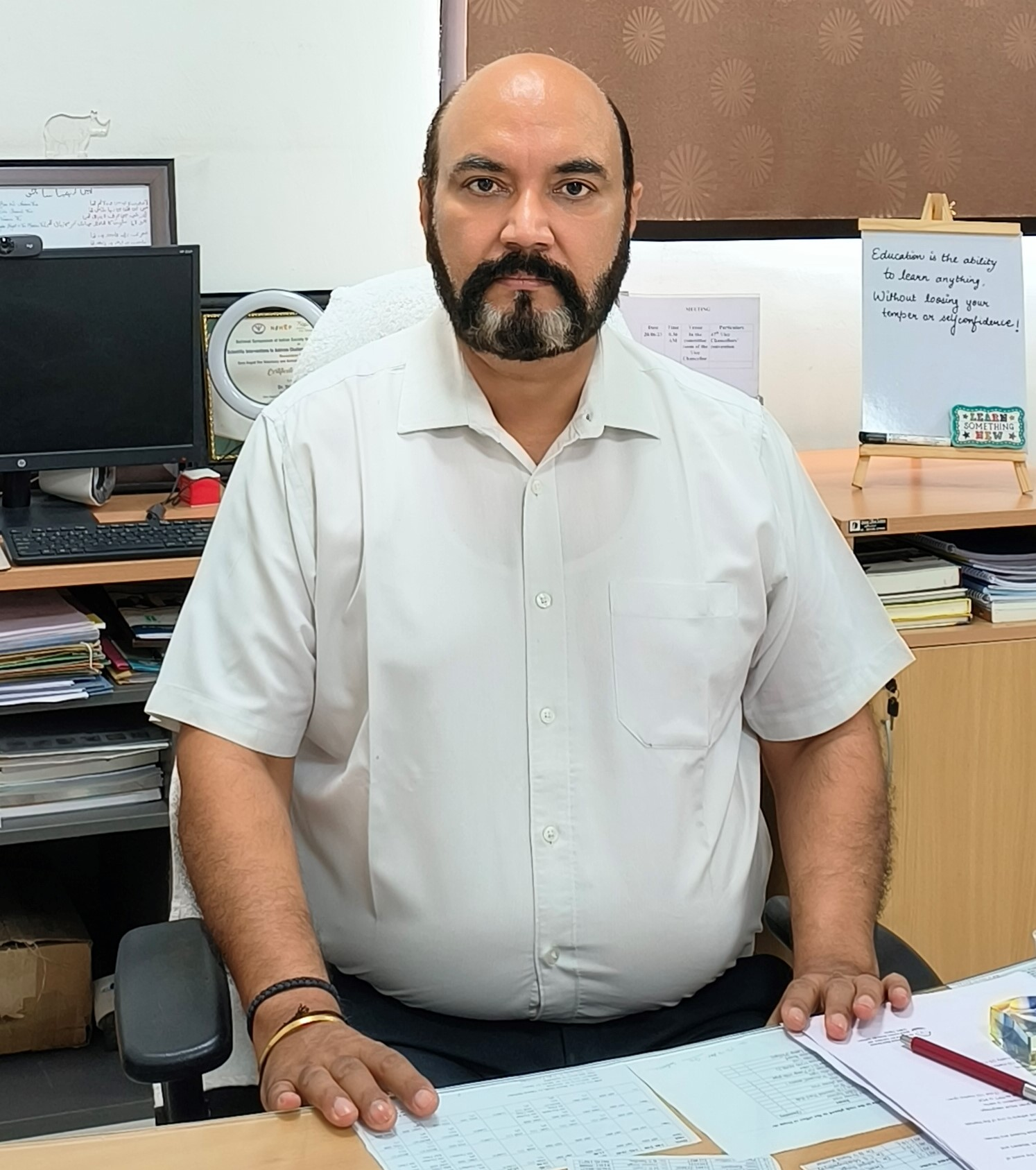
- Born: 14 October 1973 (age 52); India
- Education: Chaudhary Charan Singh Haryana Agricultural University; University of Ottawa; University of Minnesota; Wuhan Institute of Virology
- Known for: Studies on viral infections
- Awards: Jawaharlal Nehru Award (2001)
- Scientific career
- Fields: Virology; Microbiology
- Workplaces: Indian Veterinary Research Institute

Yashpal Singh Malik (born 14 October 1973) is an Indian virologist. Currently, he is serving as the Deputy Director General (Agricultural Education) at the Indian Council of Agricultural Research (ICAR) in New Delhi, India.

He has worked on coronaviruses, Japanese encephalitis virus, and rotavirus. Malik is serving the World Society for Virology as Secretary and Indian Virological Society as Secretary General.

== Biography ==
Born 14 October 1973, Malik completed his bachelor's degree in Veterinary and Animal Sciences from Chaudhary Charan Singh Haryana Agricultural University in 1995 and post-graduate studies in the field of Virology in 1997 and PhD in 2000. He joined the Indian Veterinary Research Institute (IVRI) as National Fellow from 2014 to 2020.

Malik has two National patents and he has also authored several reference books of reputed publishers. He has published a number of scientific research articles.

Malik is involved in the boards of the following professional societies:

- Secretary General of the Indian Virological Society
- Secretary of the World Society for Virology
- Joint Secretary of the Indian Society of Veterinary Immunology and Biotechnology
- Joint Secretary of the Indian Association of Veterinary Microbiologists, Immunologists and Specialists of Infectious Diseases
- FAVA Sub-Committee Member

== Awards and honours ==
Malik is recipient of several awards/honours including

- Young Scientist Award of the Association of Microbiologists of India (2000)
- Young Scientist Award of the Uttarakhand Council of Science and Technology (2010)
- Fellow of the National Academy of Biological Sciences (2016)
- Fellow of the Academy of Microbiological Sciences(2020)
- Associate Fellowship of the National Academy of Veterinary Sciences (2010)
- Associate Fellowship of the National Academy of Agricultural Sciences (2010)

== Selected bibliography ==
- Kaushik, R; Kumar, N; Kam, Y. J. Zhang; Srivastava, P; Bhatia, S; Malik, Yashpal Singh (2022-04-20). "A novel structure-based approach for identification of vertebrate susceptibility to SARS-CoV-2: implications for future surveillance programmes". Environmental Research. 212 (Part C) 113303. doi:10.1016/j.envres.2022.113303. ISSN 0013-9351. PMC 9020514. PMID 35460633. S2CID 245916322. 113303.
- Malik, Yashpal Singh; Kumar, P; Ansari, MI; Hemida, MG; El Zowalaty, ME; Abdel-Moneim, AS; Ganesh, B; Salajegheh, S; Natesan, S; Sircar, S; Safdar, M; Vinodhkumar, OR; Duarte, PM; Patel, SK; Klein, J; Rashimi, P; Dhama, K (2021-07-21). "SARS-CoV-2 Spike Protein Extrapolation for COVID Diagnosis and Vaccine Development". Frontiers in Molecular Biosciences. 315 607886. doi:10.3389/fmolb.2021.607886. ISSN 2296-889X. PMC 8355592. PMID 34395515.
- Malik, Yashpal Singh; Obli, Rajendran V; Ma, I; Pande, T; Ravichandran, K; Jaganathasamy, N; Ganesh, B; Santhakumar, A; Tazerji, SS; Rahman, MT; Safdar, M; Dubal, ZB; Dhama, K (2021-05-21). "Responses to COVID-19 in South Asian Association for Regional Cooperation (SAARC) countries in 2020, a data analysis during a world of crises". Chaos, Solitons & Fractals. 152.111311 111311. Bibcode:2021CSF...15211311M. doi:10.1016/j.chaos.2021.111311. ISSN 0960-0779. PMC 8339575. PMID 34376927.
- Malik, Yashpal Singh; Sircar, S; Bhat, S; Ansari, MI; Pande, T; Kumar, P; Mathapati, B; Balasubramanian, G; Kaushk, R; Natesan, S; Ezzikouri, S; El Zowalaty, ME; Dhama, K (2021-09-01). "How artificial intelligence may help the COVID-19 pandemic: Pitfalls and lessons for the future". Reviews in Medical Virology. 31 (5:e2205): 1–11. doi:10.1002/rmv.2205. ISSN 1099-1654. PMC 7883226. PMID 33476063.
- Malik, Yashpal Singh; Ansari, MI; Kattoor, JJ; Kaushik, R; Sircar, S; Subbaiyan, A; Tiwari, R; Dhama, K; Ghosh, S; Tomar, S; Zhang, KYJ (2021). "Evolutionary and codon usage preference insights into spike glycoprotein of SARS-CoV-2". Briefings in Bioinformatics. 22 (2:1006–1022): 1006–1022. doi:10.1093/bib/bbaa383. ISSN 1477-4054. PMC 7953982. PMID 33377145.
- Dhama, K; Khan, S; Tiwari, R; Sircar, S; Malik, Yashpal Singh; Singh, KP; Chaicumpa, W; Bonilla-Aldana, DK; Rodriguez-Morales, AJ (2020-06-20). "Coronavirus Disease 2019-COVID-19". Clinical Microbiology Reviews. 33 (4). doi:10.1128/CMR.00028-20. PMC 7405836. PMID 32580969.
