= Andrew Donskov =

Andrew Donskov is a professor of modern languages at the University of Ottawa.

His work has focused on Russian language and literature, Russian theatre, Russian peasant literature, the Doukhobors and the career of Leo Tolstoy.

== Career ==
He graduated with BA and MA degrees in Slavic Studies from the University of British Columbia before earning a PhD in Russian Literature from the University of Helsinki.

Andrew Donskov's professional career spans more than 30 years. He taught at the University of Waterloo and University of Victoria before moving to teach at the University of Ottawa in 1981. He has remained at the University of Ottawa since, being appointed as founding Director of the Slavic Research Group at the University of Ottawa and was named as a Distinguished University Professor at the same institution in 2003.

His research has been recognized by the Russian Academy of Sciences, the Petrovskaja Academy of Arts and Sciences and the Royal Society of Canada.

In 2015 he received Tolstoy Medal for Distinguished Contributions to Tolstoy Studies from the L.N. Tolstoy Museum in Moscow.

== Selected publications ==
- Leo Tolstoy and Nikolaj Strakhov: a personal and literary dialogue, Slavic Research Group, 2008. ISBN 978-0889273443
- Leo Tolstoy and the Canadian Doukhobors: A Study in Historic Relationships. Expanded and Revised Edition, University of Ottawa Press, 2019. ISBN 978-0776628509
