= Richard L'Abbé =

Canadian engineer and entrepreneur

Richard L'Abbé CM
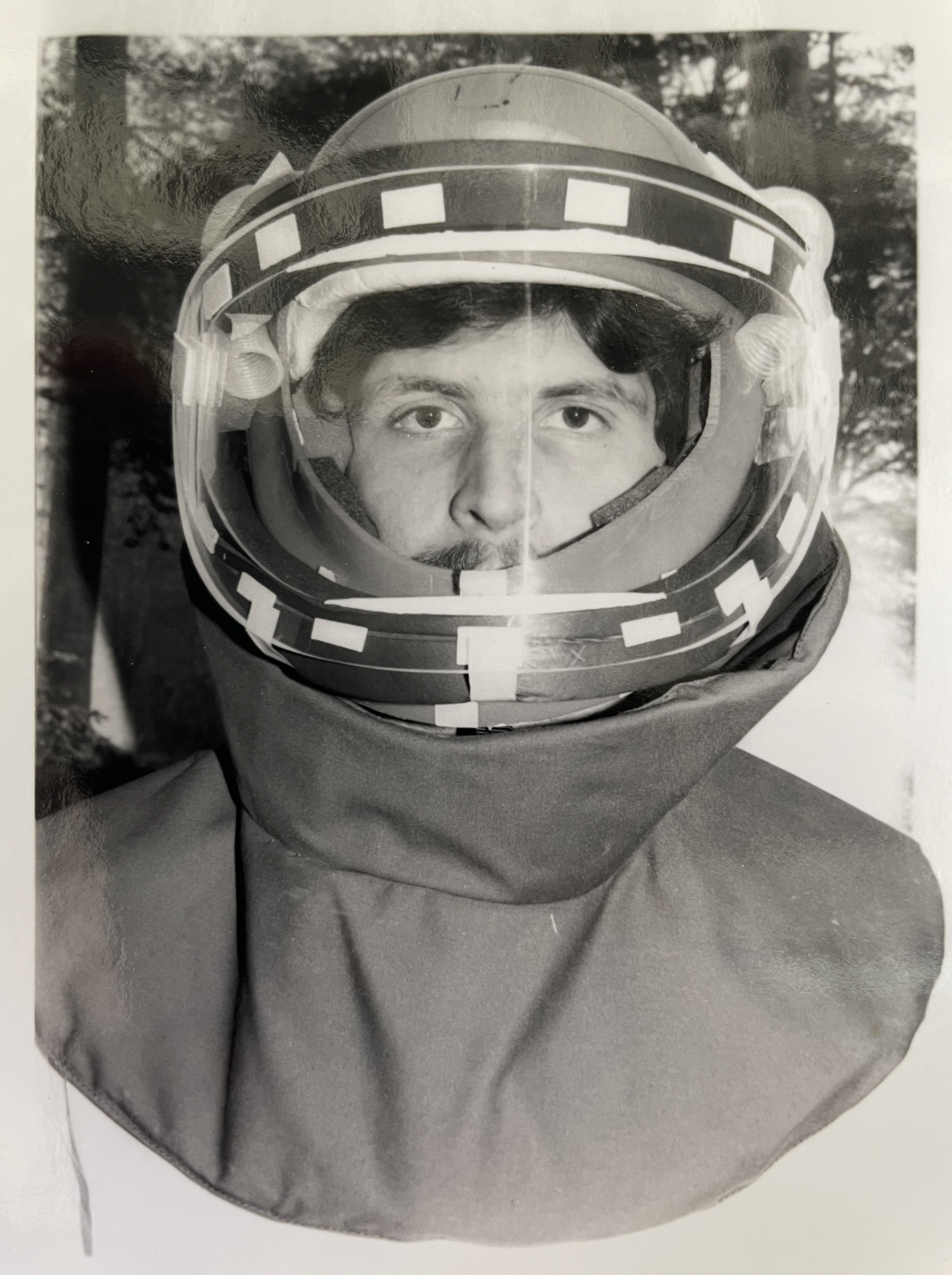
- L'Abbé wearing a prototype helmet, 1981
- Born: 1956 or 1957 (age 68–69); Ottawa, Ontario, Canada
- Occupations: Engineer; businessman
- Known for: Co-founder and former CEO of Med-Eng Systems

Richard Jean L'Abbé CM (born 1956 or 1957) is a Canadian engineer, entrepreneur, and philanthropist noted for his contributions to protective equipment used in bomb disposal applications. He is co-founder and former CEO of Med-Eng Systems Inc, a company specializing in bomb disposal suits and helmets.

L'Abbé is a graduate of the University of Ottawa with a degree in Mechanical Engineering, where the Makerspace facility bears his name. In June 2020, L'Abbé was awarded the US Navy Distinguished Public Service Award, and in 2023, he was made a Member of the Order of Canada.

== Early life and education ==
Richard Jean L'Abbé was born c. 1956 in Ottawa, Ontario. His parents were François Xavier L'Abbé, a construction industry entrepreneur, and Lucile Berthe L'Abbé (née Turgeon). He was the youngest of six siblings, including four brothers and one sister. Growing up in Ottawa, he attended the former École Secondaire Charlebois, where he participated in football, basketball, and track and field.

He continued his education at the University of Ottawa in Mechanical Engineering. Following his first year, Richard discovered flat-water sprint kayak racing and won a bronze medal in men’s K4 at the 1982 Canoe Kayak Canada Sprint National Championships.

== Career ==
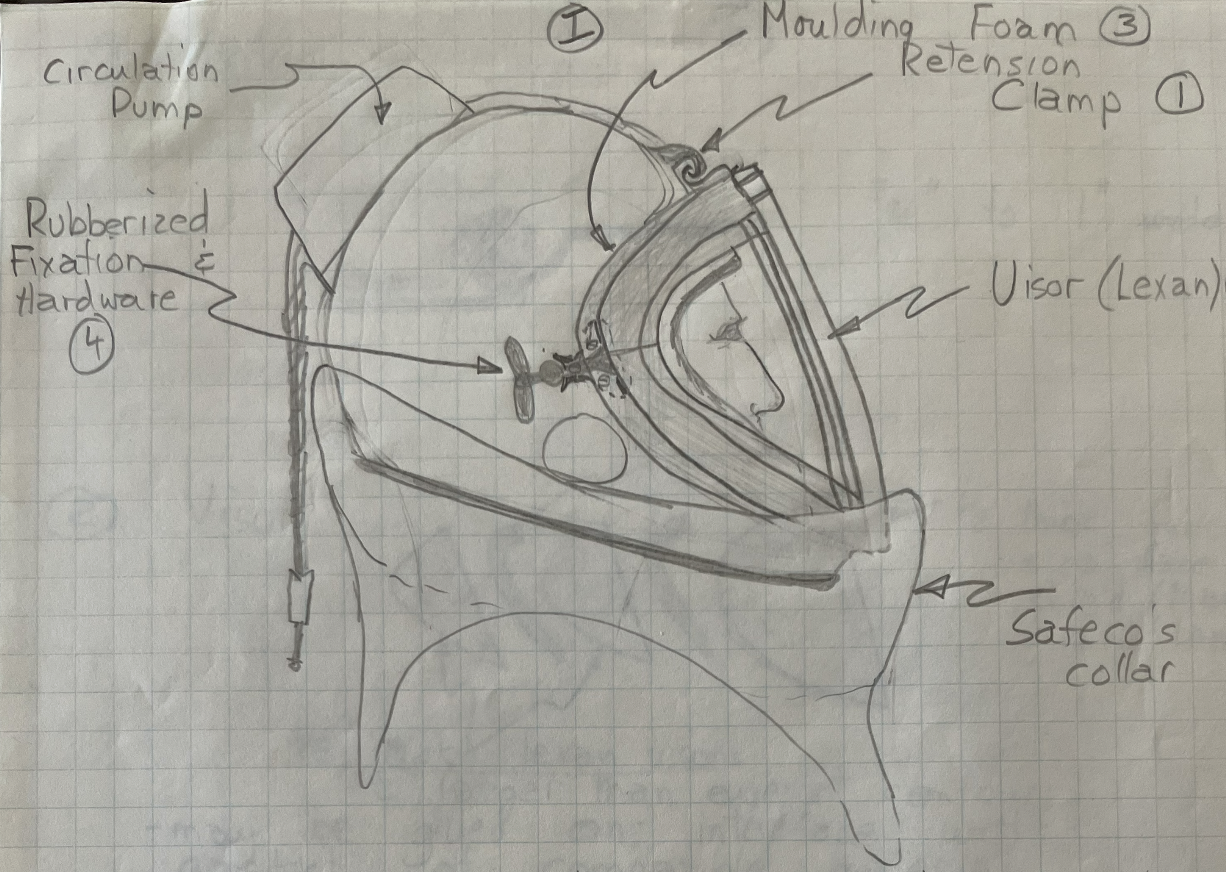
First drawing of the EOD helmet prototype from 1980

=== Biokinetics ===
L'Abbé began his professional career at Biokinetics and Associates, an Ottawa-based bioengineering consulting firm. He managed several projects including the design and prototyping of a bomb disposal helmet, as contracted by the Royal Canadian Mounted Police (RCMP). In parallel, a bomb disposal suit was developed by Toronto based Safeco Manufacturing Ltd. Both suit and helmet were approved by the RCMP for production in 1981. On the heels of this prototype, Med-Eng Systems Inc. was founded.

=== Med-Eng Systems ===
Founded in March 1981, Med-Eng Systems manufactured and supplied bomb disposal helmets. L'Abbé travelled all over the world sharing RCMP test findings on protective systems at international conferences and meetings, with sales across 110 countries by 1999. The collaboration between Med-Eng and the RCMP led to insights into overpressure, fragmentation, blast-induced head acceleration, and heat. These findings added credibility to their products within the bomb disposal community.

In one company video, L'Abbé is standing on a Quebec Police Force test ground in full protective equipment. A bomb suspended a couple of metres away explodes, kicking up a thick sheet of sand that obliterates the scene. Then L'Abbé walks casually away like any CEO off to a board meeting.

— Bert Hill, Dressed To Live, The Ottawa Citizen

In August 1986, L'Abbé conducted a live demonstration by wearing bomb disposal equipment during a controlled test explosion set off by 1kg of 75% Forcite Dynamite at a distance of 3m. He would repeat similar controlled tests an additional 18 times during his career, according to a 1998 article in People Magazine. L'Abbé personally conducted 19 explosive tests wearing bomb disposal gear to demonstrate its effectiveness.

In 1991, Med-Eng's long-time partner Safeco was sold to a Florida-based corporation and the competitive landscape started heating up. L'Abbé, now CEO of Med-Eng, began independently developing the EOD 7 bomb disposal suit, emphasizing improved comfort, flexibility, and protection. Subsequent models, the EOD-7B, EOD-8 in 1995 and 1999 respectively, and the EOD 9 in late 2002, continued this progression. In 2003, Med-Eng expanded into electronic countermeasure (ECM) systems for threat mitigation and convoy protection.

L'Abbé resigned as CEO on October 30, 2005 due to health complications associated with atrial fibrillation. In August 2007, Med-Eng Systems Inc. was sold to Allen Vanguard Corp. Med-Eng's EOD 9 bomb suit and helmet were featured in the 2008 Oscar winning film The Hurt Locker.

=== Post Med-Eng ===
L'Abbé served on the board of the University of Ottawa, La Cité collégiale and the Ottawa Heart Institute.

== Recognition ==
- Ottawa Business Journal - CEO of the Year (2003)
- U.S. Navy Distinguished Public Service Award (2020), "... in recognition for invaluable service and exceptional contributions to the United States Department of Defense ..."
- Order of Canada (2023), "For his contributions to the field of explosive ordnance disposal through his company Med-Eng, and for his support of engineering students."
- Meritas Tabaret Award for Alumni Lifetime Achievement
