= Margaret Beznak =

Hungarian-born Canadian medical researcher

Margaret Beznak (1914 – January 21, 1999) was a Hungarian-born Canadian medical researcher and chair of the physiology department at the University of Ottawa. Beznak research heart physiology, particularly enlargement and was an excellent teacher at the university medical school. She achieved a number of firsts for women in Canada, notably serving on the university Board of Governors.

== Early life ==
Margaret Hortobagyi was born in Hungary, the daughter of Béla and Margaret Hortobagyi. Both of her parents were medical doctors; her father was Chief of Surgery at a hospital in Budapest. Her brother also became a doctor.

Margaret Hortobagyi studied medicine at the University of Budapest, earning her medical degree in 1939.

== Career ==
Margaret Beznak and her husband were physiologists in Budapest until they left in 1948. They first went to Stockholm, and then to Birmingham, England, where she had a grant for her research from the Medical Research Council of Great Britain. Beznak's research focused on the causes of heart disease with the aim of prevention over treatment.

The Beznaks relocated to Ottawa in 1953, and Margaret joined the staff at the University of Ottawa soon after. She became an assistant professor there in 1956. When Aladar Beznak died in 1959, she was appointed to succeed him as department head in physiology. In 1964 Beznak received the Excellence in Research Award from the University of Ottawa.

Beznak also held the post of Vice Dean at the university, and represented the medical school faculty in the faculty senate. In 1968, she was the first woman in Canada elected to serve on the university's Board of Governors. She served as Vice Dean and Acting Dean, becoming the first woman to do so at University of Ottawa.

In 1970, she was succeeded as department chair by another Hungarian-trained physiologist, Geza Hetenyi. Upon Beznak's retirement in 1979, she was granted Emeritus Professor status.

== Personal life ==
Margaret married Aladar B. L. Beznak, a fellow physiologist, in Hungary. The couple left Hungary in 1948, on foot, with only one bag of belongings. She was widowed when he died in 1959.

Margaret Beznak died in 1999, after years with Alzheimer's disease.
