= Padmaja Subbarao =

Canadian respirologist and scientist

Academic background
- Education: B.Sc., Biology, 1990, University of Ottawa; MD, 1994, University of Toronto Faculty of Medicine; M.Sc. Epidemiology, 2002, McMaster University

Academic work
- Institutions: University of Toronto; McMaster University

Padmaja (PJ) Subbarao is a Canadian respirologist and scientist in physiology and experimental medicine. She is a Tier 1 Canada Research Chair in Pediatric Asthma and Lung Health at the University of Toronto and the Associate Chief of Clinical Research at SickKids Hospital.

== Early life and education ==
Subbarao completed her Bachelor of Science degree at the University of Ottawa before enrolling at the University of Toronto Faculty of Medicine for her medical degree. Upon earning her MD in 1994, Subbarao completed her residency at the Children's Hospital of Eastern Ontario and her fellowship at SickKids Hospital. Following her residency, Subbarao was accepted to McMaster University for her Master of Science degree in epidemiology.

== Career ==
Upon receiving her Master of Science degree in 2002, Subbarao began a research fellowship with the Canadian Lung Association and the Canadian Institutes of Health. She then joined the Canadian Healthy Infant Longitudinal Development (CHILD) Study established by Malcolm Sears to "investigate the genetic and environmental determinants of atopic diseases including asthma, allergy, allergic rhinitis, and eczema." By 2010, the CHILD study had registered 1,200 kids at birth with the intent to follow them for five years to look for the causes of asthma and allergies right from pregnancy. In 2013, Subbarao received the Breathe New Life Award from The Lung Health Foundation to fund her project; "Development of novel clinical tests to diagnose and monitor asthma in preschool children." As a member of the CHILD Study, Subbarao developed the use of novel early life lung function tools as objective measures of the onset of lung disease and established the first infant lung function laboratory in Canada.

Prior to the 2015–16 academic year, Subbarao accepted a cross-appointee in physiology at the University of Toronto. She also received the Canadian Institutes of Health Research New Investigator Salary Award for Clinical Research in cohort study and pulmonary physiology measurements. In January 2020, Subbarao received an award from the Canadian Microbiome Initiative 2 program to allow the CHILD Cohort Study researchers to better understand the role of the microbiome in human health and disease. Towards the end of the year, Subbarao and David Malkin were named leaders of the Precision Child Health initiative at Sick Kids Hospital.

In June 2021, Subbarao was awarded a Tier 1 Canada Research Chair in Pediatric Asthma and Lung Health to support her research. She also oversaw the launch of the CHILD COVID-19 Rapid Results webpage to illustrate how the pandemic was affecting the physical and mental health of Canadian families. In March 2022, Subbarao was honoured with the Michelle Harkness Mentorship Award from the Allergy, Genes and Environment Network for mentoring excellence by an established academic researcher.
