= Xiaoyi Bao =

Chinese Canadian physicist

- Education: Anhui Institute of Optics and Fine Mechanics, Chinese Academy of Sciences
- Known for: Physics, Fiber Optics
- Awards: Honorary doctorate from the University of Lethbridge

Xiaoyi Bao FRSC (Chinese: 鲍晓毅) is a Chinese Canadian physicist, recognized for her contributions to the field of fiber optics. She is a professor at the University of Ottawa, where she holds the Canada Research Chair in Fiber Optics and Photonics. Bao was awarded an honorary doctorate from the University of Lethbridge; the citation for the honour called her "a world-renowned scholar in her field."

== Biography ==
Bao was a professor at the University of New Brunswick from 1994 to 2000. In 2000, she joined the Department of Physics at the University of Ottawa. In 2003, she was named a Canada Research Chair in Fibre Optics and Physics.

Bao's areas of research include the development of fiber sensors (e.g., for temperature, strain, pressure, refractive index, and vibration); and the use of nonlinear optical effects (self-phase modulation, cross-phase modulation, four-wave mixing, and stimulated scattering) in fibers to design sensors, instrumentation, lasers, and devices. Sensor systems using Xiaoyi's methods are being used in countries around the world.

In 2015, Bao was awarded an honorary doctorate from the University of Lethbridge; the citation for the honour called her "a world-renowned scholar in her field."

== Awards and honours ==
- 2009: Fellow, Royal Society of Canada
- 2010: Fellow, The Optical Society
- 2010: Medal for Outstanding Achievement in Applied Photonics, Canadian Association of Physicists-Institut National d'Optique (CAP-INO)
- 2012: Education Foundation Award of Merit, Federation of Chinese Canadian Professionals (Ontario)
- 2012: Fellow, International Society for Optics and Photonics
- 2013: Medal for Outstanding Achievement in Industrial and Applied Physics, Canadian Association of Physicists (CAP)
- 2015: Honorary Doctor of Science, University of Lethbridge
- 2017: Canada Research Chair in Fibre Optics and Photonics
- 2021: Governor General's Innovation Award for her Distributed Acoustic Sensor
- 2023: Joseph Fraunhofer Award/Robert M. Burley Prize, The Optical Society
- 2024: CAP Medal for Lifetime Achievement in Physics
- 2024: Fellow, CAP

== Selected publications ==
- Bao, X.; Webb, D. J.; Jackson, D. A. (1993). "32-km distributed temperature sensor based on Brillouin loss in an optical fiber" (PDF). Optics Letters. 18 (18): 1561. Bibcode:1993OptL...18.1561B. doi:10.1364/OL.18.001561. PMID 19823446.
- Bao, X.; Webb, D. J.; Jackson, D. A. (1994). "Combined distributed temperature and strain sensor based on Brillouin loss in an optical fiber" (PDF). Optics Letters. 19 (2): 141. Bibcode:1994OptL...19..141B. doi:10.1364/OL.19.000141. PMID 19829571.
- Bao, X.; Dhliwayo, J.; Heron, N.; Webb, D.J.; Jackson, D.A. (1995). "Experimental and theoretical studies on a distributed temperature sensor based on Brillouin scattering". Journal of Lightwave Technology. 13 (7): 1340–1348. Bibcode:1995JLwT...13.1340B. doi:10.1109/50.400678.
- Zhang, Ziyi; Bao, Xiaoyi (2008). "Distributed optical fiber vibration sensor based on spectrum analysis of Polarization-OTDR system". Optics Express. 16 (14): 10240–7. Bibcode:2008OExpr..1610240Z. doi:10.1364/OE.16.010240. PMID 18607432.
- Li, Wenhai; Bao, Xiaoyi; Li, Yun; Chen, Liang (2008). "Differential pulse-width pair BOTDA for high spatial resolution sensing". Optics Express. 16 (26): 21616–21625. Bibcode:2008OExpr..1621616L. doi:10.1364/OE.16.021616. PMID 19104593.
- Bao, Xiaoyi; Chen, Liang (2011). "Recent Progress in Brillouin Scattering Based Fiber Sensors". Sensors. 11 (4): 4152–4187. Bibcode:2011Senso..11.4152B. doi:10.3390/s110404152. PMC 3231321. PMID 22163842.
- Bao, Xiaoyi; Chen, Liang (2012). "Recent Progress in Distributed Fiber Optic Sensors". Sensors. 12 (7): 8601–8639. Bibcode:2012Senso..12.8601B. doi:10.3390/s120708601. PMC 3444066. PMID 23012508.
