= Association for Canadian Studies =

The Association for Canadian Studies is a non-profit organization, founded at Queen's University in Kingston, Ontario, in 1973. Its activities are conducted in both official languages of Canada. Through the organization, its individual and institutional members initiate and support research and teaching in Canadian studies, particularly from interdisciplinary and multidisciplinary perspectives. The organizational membership is also concerned with the promotion of Canadian studies generally, as well as the specific training of students in Canadian studies.

Support is also provided through the organization to interdisciplinary exchanges among scholars and leaders in the public and private sectors. In addition, significant public policy and research issues are promoted in the public domain, through conferences, publications and otherwise. During the COVID-19 pandemic, the organization received a $292,690 grant from the Public Health Agency of Canada's Immunization Partnership Fund to promote COVID-19 vaccine confidence in racialized groups and newcomers to Canada.
