= Governor General's International Award for Canadian Studies =

Canadian academic award

The Governor General's International Award for Canadian Studies is an award established in 1995 by the International Council for Canadian Studies. The support for this award by the Office of the Governor General of Canada was at the initiative of late Governor General Ramon Hnatyshyn The award honours a living scholar who has made an outstanding contribution to scholarship and to the development of Canadian Studies internationally, and involves international jury selection. In alternate years, the award is referenced to a scholar of Canadian Studies whose scholarship has been developed in Canada, and a scholar of Canadian studies whose scholarship has been developed outside of Canada. Recent honourees have included Maria Teresa Gutierrez-Haces (2007), Christl Verduyn (2006) and Serge Jaumain (2005).
