= Marshall A. Cohen =

Marshall A. Cohen, OC (born March 28, 1935) is a former International Councillor for The Center for Strategic and International Studies, a member of the Executive Committee of The British-North American Committee and a former member of the Trilateral Commission. He served as Deputy Canadian Minister of Finance and Deputy Canadian Minister of Energy and is the Honorary Director of the C.D. Howe Institute. He was also the Chairman of the International Trade Advisory Committee for the Government of Canada and is Chairman of the Advisory Council of the Schulich School of Business at York University.

A graduate of the University of Toronto, Osgoode Hall Law School and York University, Cohen was called to the bar in 1960. Cohen was made an Officer of the Order of Canada in 1992.

Cohen retired as president and chief executive officer of The Molson Companies Limited in 1996. He served with the Government of Canada for 15 years, including appointments as Deputy Minister of Industry, Trade & Commerce, Energy, Mines & Resources, and Finance. He is a director of a number of public companies and a member of various non-profit boards and organizations:

- Director of Barrick Gold Corporation (since 1988)
- Director of American International Group Inc
- Director of Lafarge Corporation
- Director of Toronto-Dominion Bank
- Director of Collins & Aikman Corporation
- Director of Haynes International
- Director of Metaldyne Corporation
- Director of Premcor Inc, The Premcor Refining Group, Inc, Premcor USA Inc.
- Member of the International Advisory Committee at The Blackstone Group
- Dean's Advisory Council of Schulich School of Business at York University, Canada
