= International Council for Canadian Studies =

The International Council for Canadian Studies is a federation of twenty-one national and multi-national Canadian Studies associations and six associate members in thirty-nine countries. Established in 1981, the council operates in both official languages of Canada. The establishment of the council was subsequent to an international conference on Canadian Studies, organized by the Association for Canadian Studies in conjunction with the Annual General Meeting of the Learned Societies of Canada, held that year in Halifax, Nova Scotia. The mandate of the council is "to promote worldwide scholarly study, research, teaching and publication about Canada in all disciplines and all countries."

It sponsors Canadian studies conferences in other countries.
