= Jocelyne Bourgon =

Canadian public servant

The Honourable Jocelyne Bourgon PC OC

President of the Canadian Centre for Management Development
- In office 1999–2003
- Prime Minister: Jean Chrétien

Clerk of the Privy Council and Secretary to the Cabinet
- In office March 28, 1994 – January 17, 1999
- Prime Minister: Jean Chrétien
- Preceded by: Glen Shortliffe
- Succeeded by: Mel Cappe

Deputy Minister of Transport
- In office 1993–1994
- Minister: Jean Corbeil; Doug Young
- Preceded by: Huguette Labelle
- Succeeded by: Bill Rowat

President of the Canadian International Development Agency
- In office 1993
- Minister: Monique Landry
- Preceded by: Marcel Massé
- Succeeded by: Huguette Labelle

Secretary to the Cabinet for Federal-Provincial Relations
- In office 1992–1993
- Prime Minister: Brian Mulroney

Deputy Minister of Consumer and Corporate Affairs
- In office 1989–1991
- Minister: Pierre Blais (acting); Pierre H. Vincent
- Preceded by: Ian D. Clark
- Succeeded by: Nancy Hughes Anthony

Personal details
- Born: September 20, 1950 (age 76) Papineauville, Quebec
- Education: Université de Montréal; University of Ottawa

Jocelyne Bourgon, PC OC (born September 20, 1950) is a former Canadian public servant. She was the first woman appointed as the Clerk of the Privy Council, serving from 1994 until 1999.

== Life and career ==
Born in Papineauville, Quebec, she studied in science (Biology) at the University of Montreal and then management at the University of Ottawa. She first joined the public service of Canada as a summer student with the Department of Transport in 1974, and was promoted to successively more senior positions thereafter. During this time, she played a key role in organizing First Ministers' Conferences on the Canadian economy, most notably those that led to the Canada-U.S. free trade agreement. She also served in several Departments including Consumer and Corporate Affairs, Cabinet Secretary for Federal-Provincial Relations, President of Canadian International Development Agency (CIDA), and Transport Canada.

Bourgon rapidly progressed through the ranks, and was appointed to the rank of Deputy Minister in 1989. As Deputy Minister, she led major legislative reforms, led the Constitutional negotiations that led to the Charlottetown Accord (1992), and prepared a major reform leading to the privatization of rail and airports.

=== Clerk of the Privy Council ===
In 1994, she was appointed Clerk of the Privy Council and Secretary to the Canadian Cabinet becoming the first woman to exercise these functions in Canada.In this capacity she led some of the most ambitious public sector reforms in Canada since the early 1940s. She oversaw the Program review that led to the elimination of the budget deficit and the reduction of the public service by 47,000 positions, and introduced measures to enhance the policy capacity and the renewal of the Public Service (La Releve).

=== Later career ===
Bourgon served as President of the Canadian Centre for Management Development from 1999 to 2003 leading to the creation of the Canada School of Public Service where she was named President emeritus. She served as Ambassador to the OECD from 2003 until 2007. She was a Distinguished Fellow at The Centre for International Governance Innovation (CIGI) and visiting professor at the University of Waterloo. She is advising several countries about public service reforms, including Singapore, Malaysia, Denmark, Finland, France, etc.

She is an active international speaker, participating in various International events, conferences to advance public service reforms, most notably at the OECD, Brazil (World Bank), IPAA (Dublin), IPA (Sydney), London School of Economics (LSE), Institute for Government (London), etc. Her keynotes and lectures are frequently published.

She was active on various international boards and committees including President of CEPA at the UN, former President of CAPAM, Board member UK Civil Service College, Governor of the Institute for Government, Singapore Civil Service College, etc.

She is the leader of the New Synthesis Project. This project aspires to transform the way people think about the role of government in a post-industrial era. She is also the author of A New Synthesis of Public Administration: Serving in the 21st Century.

Member of the Board of the Industrial Alliance Financial Group since 2014, she became Chair of the Board in May 2017, the first woman to occupy this position in the 125 year history of the company (see IS press release).

=== Awards ===
She has received numerous awards and recognition including the Order of Canada, the Outstanding Achievement Award, and six Honorary degrees from Canadian universities. In recognition of her contribution to her country she was summoned as member of the Queen Privy Council and granted the title of "Honourable".

In addition to a large number of articles in various administrative journals, she has published three books: The New Synthesis of Public Administration (2011), The New Synthesis Fieldbook (2017), and A Public Servant's Voice: Through the Words of the First Woman Clerk of the Privy Council for Canada (2026).
