= Gilles G. Patry =

Canadian engineer and academic administrator (born 1950)

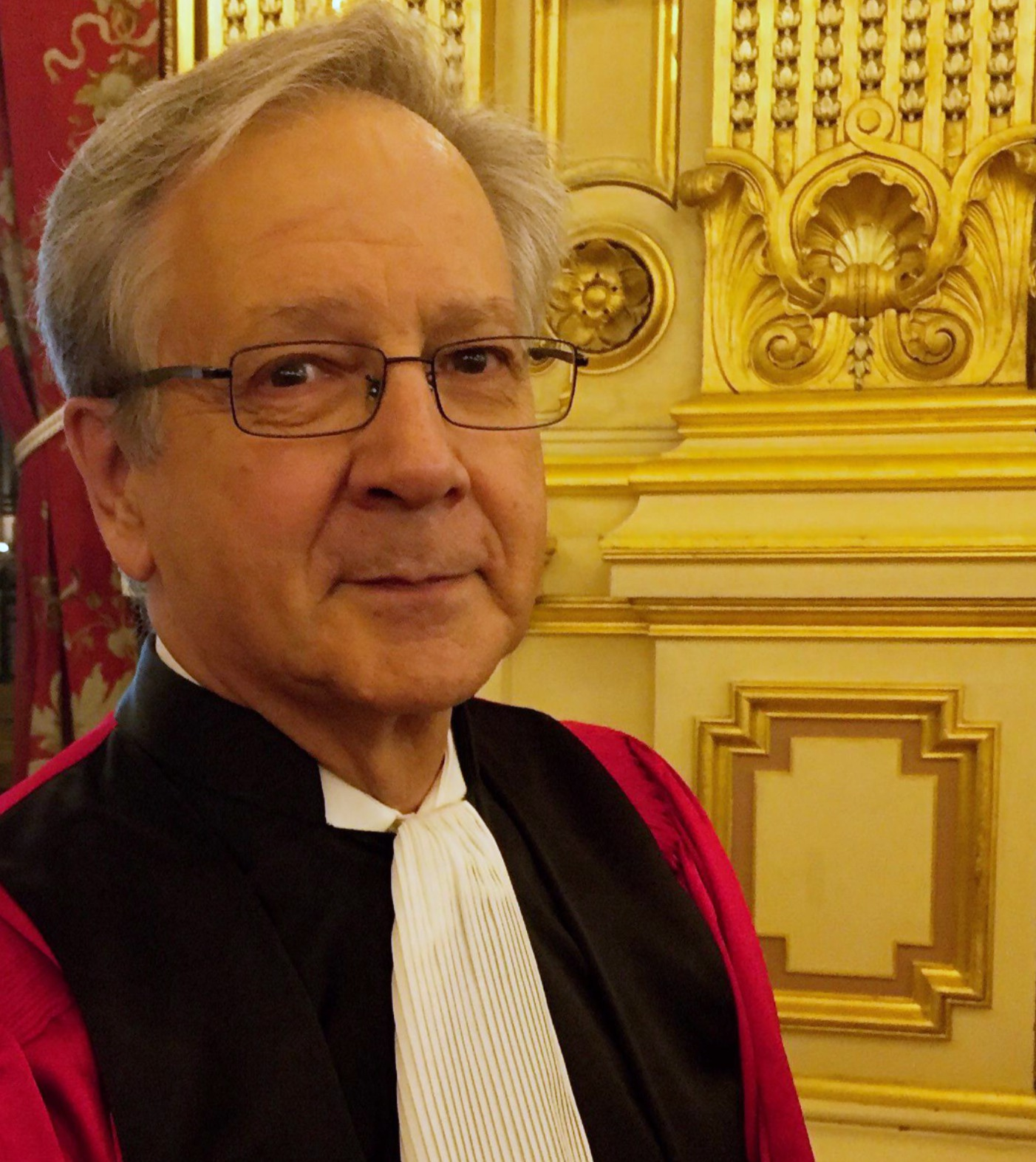
- Patry in 2016
- Born: Hull, Quebec, Canada
- Occupations: Engineer, academic administrator
- Known for: President of the University of Ottawa (2001–2008); President and CEO of the Canada Foundation for Innovation (2010–2017); Executive Director of the U15 (2017–2022)
- Awards: Member of the Order of Canada (2010); Recipient of the Order of Ontario (2011); Fellow of the Canadian Academy of Engineering; Fellow of the Royal Society of Canada

Academic background
- Education: University of Ottawa (BASc, MASc)); University of California, Davis (PhD)

Academic work
- Discipline: Environmental engineering, higher education leadership, research policy
- Institutions: École Polytechnique; McMaster University; University of Ottawa; Canada Foundation for Innovation; U15 Group of Canadian Research Universities
- Notable works: Founding president of Hydromantis, Inc.; GPS-X - a wastewater modeling and simulation tool; leadership in Canadian research infrastructure
- Website: Official website

Gilles G. Patry CM OOnt FCAE FRSC PEng (born July 1950) is a Canadian engineer, academic researcher and administrator. He served as president and vice-chancellor of the University of Ottawa from 2001 to 2008, president and chief executive officer of the Canada Foundation for Innovation (2010–2017), and executive director of the U15 Group of Canadian Research Universities from 2017 to 2022. He is a member of the Order of Canada and a recipient of the Order of Ontario, a Fellow of the Canadian Academy of Engineering and a Fellow of the Royal Society of Canada.

== Early life and education ==
Patry was born in Hull, Quebec (now part of Gatineau, Quebec) in 1950. He earned a BASc and a MASc in civil engineering from the University of Ottawa in 1971 and 1973, respectively, and later a PhD in civil/environmental engineering from the University of California, Davis in 1983. Following graduation in 1971, Patry started his career as a consulting engineer in Hull and Montreal (Alary, Tanguay & Assoc. (1971-1973) and Bessette, Crevier, Parent, Tanguay and Assoc. (BCPTA) - 1973-1978). Starting in 1975, Patry taught part-time at Ecole Polytechnique de Montréal.

== Academic career ==
In 1978, Patry joined Ecole Polytechnique de Montréal as Assistant Professor while completing his PhD at UC Davis in 1983. Patry joined the Department of Civil Engineering at McMaster University in July 1983 as Associate Professor. While at McMaster, he created Hydromantis, Inc., a small boutique consulting firm specializing in wastewater treatment plant modeling. His research led to the development of GPS-X™, a modular multi-purpose modeling system for the simulation of wastewater treatment plant dynamics. In 2021, Hydromantis was integrated into Hatch Engineering water group. In 2006, his 1991 paper, titled "Dynamic Modeling of the Clarification-Thickening Process", published with Imre Takács and Daniel Nolasco, was recognized as one of the ten most ground-breaking papers in the 40-year history of Water Research.

In 1993, he returned to the University of Ottawa as dean of engineering. In 1997, he was appointed vice-rector (academic) and in 2001 he became president and vice-chancellor of the university, a position he held until 2008.

== National research leadership ==
In 2010, Patry was appointed president and CEO of the Canada Foundation for Innovation (CFI). He led the organization until 2017.

From 2017 to 2022, Patry served as executive director of the U15 Group of Canadian Research Universities, representing the country’s leading research-intensive institutions.

In October 2022, Patry was appointed a member of the Government of Canada, Advisory Panel on the Federal Research Support System along with Frédéric Bouchard (Chair), Janet Rossant, Laurel Schafer, Yolande E. Chan, Baljit Singh and Vianne Timmons. Minister of Innovation, Science and Industry, François-Philippe Champagne released the report in March 2023.

Currently, Patry is a member of the Board of Directors of the Royal Canadian Mint and a member of the Board of Trustees at Queen's University .

== Honours and recognition ==
- Member of the Order of Canada (2010)
- Member of the Order of Ontario (2011)
- Fellow of the Canadian Academy of Engineering (2002)
- Chevalier, Ordre de la Pléiade (2009)
- Queen Elizabeth II Golden Jubilee Medal (2002)
- Queen Elizabeth II Diamond Jubilee Medal (2012)
- Fellow of the Royal Society of Canada (2020)
- Honorary doctorates from Canadian and international universities, including the University of Waterloo, McMaster University, Western University, Carleton University, University of Ottawa, McGill University and INSA Lyon.

== See also ==
- Hydromantis, Inc.
- Ecole Polytechnique de Montréal
- University of Ottawa
- Canada Foundation for Innovation
- U15 Group of Canadian Research Universities
