= Canadian studies =

Academic discipline

Canadian studies is an interdisciplinary field of undergraduate- and postgraduate-level study of Canadian culture and society, the languages of Canada, Canadian literature, media and communications, Quebec, Acadians, agriculture in Canada, natural resources and geography of Canada, the history of Canada and historiography of Canada, Canadian government and politics, and legal traditions. Similar ranges of subjects centred on indigenous peoples in Canada (First Nations, Inuit, Métis) may be part of Indigenous (Native) studies, Canadian studies or both.

Several universities that offer Canadian studies undergraduate degrees recommend that students take a double major (e.g. political science, international relations or French), if not included in the course. Some careers for students who take Canadian studies include the foreign service and working at Canadian embassies or the foreign embassies in Canada.

Scholars known for their work in Canadian studies include Fernand Ouellet, Linda Hutcheon, George Ramsay Cook, William T. R. Fox, Annette Baker Fox, Susan Swan, Christl Verduyn, Sergey Rogov, and George Melnyk. The Governor General's International Award for Canadian Studies is an award for excellence in the field and was established in 1995 by the International Council for Canadian Studies. The International Council for Canadian Studies is a confederal academic society including the Canadian Studies Network which is based in Canada, and Canadian studies associations in numerous other countries. The Association for Canadian Studies aims to connect Canadian studies scholarship with the Canadian public.

== Centres ==
A number of universities have specialized programmes and centres of Canadian studies. These include:

- Canada
  - Acadia University: Canadian Studies
  - Carleton University: School of Canadian Studies
  - McGill University: Institute for the Study of Canada
  - Mount Allison University: Centre for Indigenous and Critical Canadian Studies
  - University of British Columbia: Canadian Studies
  - University of Manitoba Canadian Studies
  - University of Ottawa: Canadian Studies
  - University of Prince Edward Island: Canadian Studies
  - University of Waterloo: Canadian Studies
  - Trent University: School for the Study of Canada
- United States
  - Boise State University: Canadian Studies minor
  - Bowling Green State University: Canadian Studies
  - Bridgewater State University: Canadian Studies
  - State University of New York Plattsburgh: Center for the Study of Canada
  - University of California Berkeley: Canadian Studies Program
  - University of Washington: Canadian Studies Center
  - Yale University: Committee on Canadian Studies
- Europe
  - Queen's University Belfast: Centre of Canadian Studies
  - University College Dublin: Centre for Canadian Studies
  - University of Edinburgh: Centre of Canadian Studies
  - University of Nottingham: Department of American and Canadian Studies

== Organizations ==
- Association for Canadian Studies in the United States
- British Association for Canadian Studies
- International Council for Canadian Studies

== Journals ==
- American Review of Canadian Studies
- Journal of Canadian Studies
- London Journal of Canadian Studies

== Specialist studies ==
=== First Nations and Indigenous studies ===
First Nations and Indigenous studies is the interdisciplinary study of indigenous people in Canada. There are several opportunities to specialise in Indigenous studies.

- Cape Breton University Mi'kmaq Studies
- Dalhousie University Indigenous Studies
- Lakehead University Learning - Inuit
- University of British Columbia First Nations and Indigenous Studies
- University of Manitoba Department of Indigenous Studies
- University of Saskatchewan Department of Indigenous Studies
- University of Alberta Faculty of Native Studies
- York University Indigenous Studies
- Études Inuit Studies

=== Acadian studies – Études Acadiennes ===
- University of Prince Edward Island
  - Acadian Studies
- Université de Moncton
  - Centre d'Études Acadiennes Anselme-Chiasson
- Université Sainte-Anne
  - Université Sainte Anne Centre Acadien

=== Quebec studies – Études québécoises ===
==== Canada ====
- McGill University
  - Programme d'études québecoises
- Université du Québec à Montréal
  - Études québécoises
- Université du Québec à Trois-Rivières
  - Études québécoises
- Université TÉLUQ
  - Certificat en études québécoises
- Université Laval / Université de Montréal
  - Centre interuniversitaire d’études québécoises
- Nouvelles études québécoises
- Association internationale des études québécoises

==== United States ====
- State University of New York Plattsburgh Institute of Québec Studies
- University at Buffalo Québec Studies
- American Council for Québec Studies
  - Québec Studies

=== British Columbia studies ===
- University of British Columbia
  - BC Studies

=== Newfoundland studies ===
- Memorial University of Newfoundland
  - Certificate in Newfoundland and Labrador Studies
  - Centre for Newfoundland Studies

=== New Brunswick studies ===
- University of New Brunswick
  - Journal of New Brunswick Studies

== See also ==
- Bibliography of Canada
- Canadiana
- Historiography of Canada
- List of Canadian historians
- International rankings of Canada
