= Federal Accountability Act =

Canadian act of Parliament

Parliament of Canada
- Long title: An Act providing for conflict of interest rules, restrictions on election financing and measures respecting administrative transparency, oversight and accountability
- Citation: Statues of Canada 2006 chapter 9
- Territorial extent: Canada
- Enacted by: House of Commons
- Enacted by: Senate
- Royal assent: December 12, 2006

Legislative history

Initiating chamber: House of Commons
- Bill title: 39th Parliament, Bill C-2
- Introduced by: John Baird, President of the Treasury Board
- First reading: April 11, 2006
- Second reading: April 27, 2006
- Third reading: June 21, 2006

Revising chamber: Senate
- Bill title: 39th Parliament, Bill C-2
- Member(s) in charge: Joseph A. Day
- First reading: June 22, 2006
- Second reading: June 27, 2006
- Third reading: November 9, 2006

Amends
- Access to Information Act, Auditor General Act, Business Development Bank of Canada Act, Canada Council for the Arts Act, Canada Elections Act, Canada Mortgage and Housing Corporations Act, Canada Post Corporation Act, Canada Revenue Agency Act, Canadian Commercial Corporation Act, Canadian Dairy Commission Act, Canadian Race Relations Foundation Act, Canadian Tourism Commission Act, Canadian Wheat Board Act, Cape Breton Development Corporation Act, Conflict of Interest Act, Criminal Code, Department of Justice Act, Department of Public Works and Government Services Act, Director of Public Prosecutions Act, Enterprise Cape Breton Corporation Act, Export Development Act, Farm Credit Canada Act, Federal Courts Act, Financial Administration Act, First Nations Fiscal and Statistical Management Act, Freshwater Fish Marketing Act, Garnishment, Attachment and Pension Diversion Act, Government Employees Compensation Act, Income Tax Act, Library and Archives of Canada Act, Lobbying Act (Lobbyists Registration Act), Museums Act, National Arts Centre Act, National Capital Act, Non-smokers' Health Act, Official Languages Act, Parliament of Canada Act, Parliamentary Employment and Staff Relations Act, Pilotage Act, Privacy Act, Public Sector Pension Investment Board Act, Public Servants Disclosure Protection Act, Public Service Employment Act, Public Service Superannuation Act, Radiocommunication Act, Royal Canadian Mint Act, Salaries Act, Standards Council of Canada Act
- Status: Current legislation

The Federal Accountability Act ("FedAA": French: Loi fédérale sur la responsabilité) is a statute introduced as Bill C-2 in the first session of the 39th Canadian Parliament on April 11, 2006, by the President of the Treasury Board, John Baird. The aim was to reduce the opportunity to exert influence with money by banning corporate, union, and large personal political donations; five-year lobbying ban on former ministers, their aides, and senior public servants; providing protection for whistleblowers; and enhancing the power of the Auditor General to follow the money spent by the government.

The bill aimed to increase the transparency of government spending, and to establish clearer links between approved expenditures and their outcomes. The bill was passed by the House of Commons on June 22, 2006, by the Senate on November 9, 2006, and was granted royal assent on December 12, 2006.

== Provisions ==
The following are some of the major changes instituted by the Federal Accountability Act:

Auditing and accountability within departments

- One of the biggest changes, recommended by the Gomery Commission, was that deputy ministers became "accounting officers", reporting directly to Parliament (thereby bypassing their ministers) on the financial administration of their respective departments.
- A mechanism to resolve disputes between ministers and deputy ministers, and to document such resolutions, was also created.

Independent Oversight Offices

A number of new independent oversight offices were created, reporting directly to Parliament on the administration of the government.

- The Commissioner of Lobbying replaced the Registrar of Lobbyists as a fully independent office with greater investigative powers.
- The Parliamentary Budget Officer provides Parliament with objective analysis about government estimates, the state of the nation's finances, and trends in the national economy.
- The Public Sector Integrity Commissioner promotes whistleblowing and protects whistleblowers from negative repercussions in the workplace.
- The Office of the Procurement Ombudsman reviews and investigates complaints against government procurement practices.
- The Conflict of Interest and Ethics Commissioner administers the Conflict of Interest Code for Members of the House of Commons.

New limits on individual donations to parties and candidates

- Prohibition of gifts or other benefits to a candidate for political office that influences or appears to influence the performance of that office if elected.
- Individual political contributions limited to $1,100 to different aspects of a single political organization: $1,100 to a registered party; $1,100 to a registered party's candidates, nomination contestants, and constituency associations, collectively; and $1,100 to leadership contestants collectively.
- Corporations, unions and organizations were banned from contributing to parties and candidates.
- Candidates must report all gifts over $500 to the Chief Electoral Officer.

Lobbying

- Senior public officials prohibited from engaging in lobbying for 5 years after their employment has ceased.

Public Appointments Commission

- Proposed creation of a Public Appointments Commission to develop guidelines, review and approve the selection processes proposed by Ministers to fill vacancies within their portfolios, and report publicly on the Government's compliance with the guidelines. However, no such commission has yet been created.

Access to information

- Increased scope of the Access to Information Act, to cover a number of Crown Corporations, which can now be called upon by the public to disclose their records.

Independent Prosecution

- The Public Prosecution Service of Canada was made independent of the rest of the Department of Justice, although the Director of Public Prosecutions still reports to the Minister of Justice.

== History ==
The Federal Accountability Act was the first bill to be tabled by the newly elected Conservative Government. It took about nine months to pass and was significantly amended in the Senate.

The development of the Act was informed by the Conservative Party election platform for the January 2006 election and by Phase 2 of the Gomery Report (Recommendations).

When delivering his sponsor's speech in Parliament, John Baird described it as the "toughest anti-corruption law ever passed in Canada".

== Amended legislation ==
The Federal Accountability Act is an omnibus legislation - one that amends a number of other statutes. It amended the following:

- Access to Information Act
- Auditor General Act
- Business Development Bank of Canada Act
- Canada Council for the Arts Act
- Canada Elections Act
- Canada Mortgage and Housing Corporations Act
- Canada Post Corporation Act
- Canada Revenue Agency Act
- Canadian Commercial Corporation Act
- Canadian Dairy Commission Act
- Canadian Race Relations Foundation Act
- Canadian Tourism Commission Act
- Canadian Wheat Board Act
- Cape Breton Development Corporation Act
- Conflict of Interest Act
- Criminal Code
- Department of Justice Act
- Department of Public Works and Government Services Act
- Director of Public Prosecutions Act
- Enterprise Cape Breton Corporation Act
- Export Development Act
- Farm Credit Canada Act
- Federal Courts Act
- Financial Administration Act
- First Nations Fiscal and Statistical Management Act
- Freshwater Fish Marketing Act
- Garnishment, Attachment and Pension Diversion Act
- Government Employees Compensation Act
- Income Tax Act
- Library and Archives of Canada Act
- Lobbying Act (Lobbyists Registration Act)
- Museums Act
- National Arts Centre Act
- National Capital Act
- Non-smokers' Health Act
- Official Languages Act
- Parliament of Canada Act
- Parliamentary Employment and Staff Relations Act
- Pilotage Act
- Privacy Act
- Public Sector Pension Investment Board Act
- Public Servants Disclosure Protection Act
- Public Service Employment Act
- Public Service Superannuation Act
- Radiocommunication Act
- Royal Canadian Mint Act
- Salaries Act
- Standards Council of Canada Act
