= Whistleblowing =

Exposing of scandalous activity

Whistleblowing (also whistle-blowing or whistle blowing) is the activity of a person, often an employee, revealing information about activity within a private or public organization that is deemed wrongful – whether it be illegal, immoral, illicit, unsafe, unethical, or fraudulent. Whistleblowers can communicate in a variety of ways internally, and/or publicly. Over 83% of whistleblowers report internally to a supervisor, human resources, compliance, or a neutral third party within the company, hoping that the company will address and correct the issues. A whistleblower can also bring allegations to light by communicating with external entities, often becoming a source in investigative journalism or other media, or law enforcement or other government agents. Some countries legislate as to what constitutes a protected disclosure, and the permissible methods of presenting a disclosure. Whistleblowing can occur in the private sector or the public sector.

Whistleblowers often face retaliation for their disclosure, including termination of employment, or criminal persecution for revealing classified governments secrets. Several other actions may also be considered retaliatory, including an unreasonable increase in workloads, reduction of hours, preventing task completion, mobbing or bullying. Whistleblower protection laws in many countries offer some protection for whistleblowers and regulate whistleblowing activities. These laws tend to adopt different approaches to public and private sector whistleblowing. They do not always achieve their aims; for their claims to be credible and successful, they must have compelling evidence so that the government or regulating body can investigate them and hold corrupt organizations to account. To succeed, they must also persist in their efforts over what can often be years, in the face of extensive, coordinated and prolonged efforts that institutions can deploy to silence, discredit, isolate, and erode their financial and mental well-being. They have been likened to "prophets at work", but many lose their jobs, are victims of campaigns to discredit and isolate them, suffer financial and mental pressures, and some lose their lives.

== Overview ==
=== Origin of term ===
American civic activist Ralph Nader is said to have coined the phrase in the early 1970s to avoid the negative connotations found in other words such as "informer" and "snitch". However, the origins of the word date back to the 19th century. The word is linked to the use of a whistle to alert the public or a crowd about such problems as the commission of a crime or the breaking of rules during a game. The phrase whistle blower attached itself to law enforcement officials in the 19th century because they used a whistle to alert the public or fellow police. Sports referees, who use a whistle to indicate an illegal or foul play, also were called whistleblowers. An 1883 story in Wisconsin's Janesville Gazette called a policeman who used his whistle to alert citizens about a riot a whistle blower, without the hyphen. By the year 1963, the phrase had become a hyphenated word, whistle-blower. The word began to be used by journalists in the 1960s to refer to people who revealed wrongdoing, such as Nader. It eventually evolved into the compound word whistleblower.

=== Channels for whistleblowing ===
==== Internal channels ====
Most whistleblowers are internal whistleblowers, who report misconduct on a fellow employee or superior within their company through anonymous reporting mechanisms often called hotlines. Within such situations, circumstances and factors can cause a person to either act on the spot to prevent/stop illegal and unacceptable behavior, or report it. There are some reasons to believe that people are more likely to take action with respect to unacceptable behavior, within an organization, if there are complaint systems that offer not just options dictated by the planning and control organization, but a choice of options for absolute confidentiality.

Anonymous reporting mechanisms, as mentioned previously, help foster a climate whereby employees are more likely to report or seek guidance regarding potential or actual wrongdoing without fear of retaliation. The coming anti-bribery management systems standard, ISO 37001, includes anonymous reporting as one of the criteria for the new standard.

==== External channels ====
External whistleblowers report misconduct to outside people or entities. In these cases, depending on the nature of the information, whistleblowers may report the misconduct to lawyers, the media, law enforcement or watchdog agencies, or other local, state, or federal agencies. In some cases, external whistleblowing is encouraged by offering monetary rewards.

==== Third-party channels ====
Sometimes organizations use external agencies to create a secure and anonymous reporting channel for their employees, often referred to as a whistleblowing hotline. In addition to protecting the identity of the whistleblower, these services are designed to inform the individuals at the top of the organizational pyramid of misconduct, usually via integration with specialized case management software.

Implementing a third-party solution is often the easiest way for an organization to promote compliance, or to offer a whistleblowing policy where one did not previously exist. An increasing number of companies and authorities use third-party services in which the whistleblower is also anonymous to the third-party service provider, which is made possible via toll-free phone numbers and/or web or app-based solutions that apply asymmetrical encryption.

=== Private versus public sectors ===
==== Private-sector whistleblowing ====
Private-sector whistleblowing is arguably more prevalent and suppressed in society today. An example of private sector whistleblowing is when an employee reports to someone in a higher position such as a manager or to external factors, such as their lawyer or the police. Whistleblowing in the private sector is typically not high-profile or openly discussed in major news outlets, though occasionally, third parties expose human rights violations and exploitation of workers.

Many governments attempt to protect such whistleblowers. In the United States, for example, there are organizations such as the United States Department of Labor (DOL) and laws such as the Sarbanes-Oxley Act and the United States Federal Sentencing Guidelines for Organizations (FSGO) that protect whistleblowers in the private sector. Thus, despite government efforts to help regulate the private sector, the employees must still weigh their options. They may expose the company and stand on the moral and ethical high ground, but lose their job, their reputation, and potentially the ability to be employed again. According to a study at the University of Pennsylvania, out of three hundred whistleblowers studied, sixty-nine percent had foregone that exact situation. They were either fired or forced to retire after taking the ethical high ground. It is outcomes like these that make it all that much harder to accurately track the prevalence of whistleblowing in the private sector.

==== Public sector whistleblowing ====
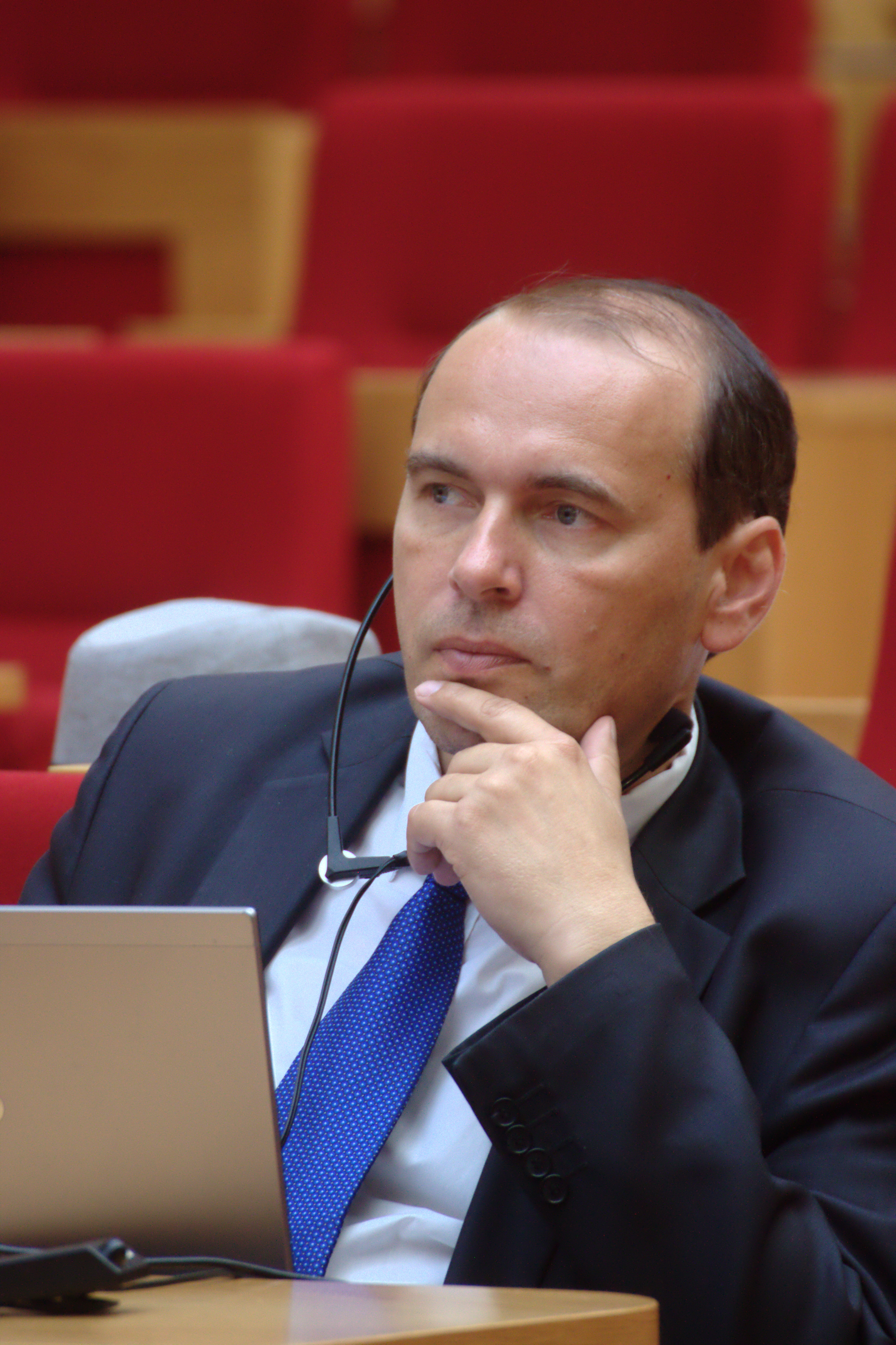
Czech whistleblower Libor Michálek was fired from his position after exposing high-level corruption.

Public sector whistleblowing is connected to the concept of public service motivation, where a public servant's altruistic alignment to the people or communities they serve overrides their adherence to their employer's rules. This connection has been demonstrated by research in many different countries, including Poland, Thailand and the United States of America. Recognition of the value of public sector whistleblowing has been growing over the last 50 years. Many jurisdictions have passed legislation to protect public service whistleblowing in part as a way to address unethical behaviour and corruption within public service agencies.

In the United States, for example, both state and Federal statutes have been put in place to protect whistleblowers from retaliation. The United States Supreme Court ruled that public sector whistleblowers are protected from retaliation by their First Amendment rights. After many federal whistleblowers were covered in high-profile media cases, laws were finally introduced to protect government whistleblowers. These laws were enacted to help prevent corruption and encourage people to expose misconduct, illegal, or dishonest activity for the good of society. People who choose to act as whistleblowers often suffer retaliation from their employer. They most likely are fired because they are an at-will employee, which means they can be fired without a reason. There are exceptions in place for whistleblowers who are at-will employees. Even without a statute, numerous decisions encourage and protect whistleblowing on grounds of public policy. Statutes state that an employer shall not take any adverse employment actions against any employee in retaliation for a good-faith report of a whistleblowing action or cooperating in any way in an investigation, proceeding, or lawsuit arising under said action. Federal whistleblower legislation includes a statute protecting all government employees. In the federal civil service, the government is prohibited from taking, or threatening to take, any personnel action against an employee because the employee disclosed information that they reasonably believed showed a violation of law, gross mismanagement, and gross waste of funds, abuse of authority, or a substantial and specific danger to public safety or health. To prevail on a claim, a federal employee must show that a protected disclosure was made, that the accused official knew of the disclosure, that retaliation resulted, and that there was a genuine connection between the retaliation and the employee's action.

==== Whistleblowing in the scientific community ====
Research fraud involves data, processes, or observations that were never there to begin with or were later added on to fit a claim or narrative. A case involving the scientific community engaging in research fraudulence is that of Dr. Cyril Burt. Dr Cyril Burt was a British psychologist who proposed that he had discovered a heritable factor for intelligence based on studying twins. Dr. Oliver Gillie, a former colleague of Dr. Burt, inquired about Dr. Burt's work, doubting the authenticity of the data and the certain twins on which Dr. Burt was basing his research. Dr. Gillies's inquiry revealed that there were discrepancies in Dr. Burt's work, with inconsistencies in the twins' birth dates, particularly with the absence of records for twins to participate in the study, the falsification of data, and the "invention of crucial facts to support his controversial theory that intelligence is largely inherited." This led to the eventual retraction of Dr. Burt’s work.

Data manipulation is the changing or omitting of data or outcomes in such a way that the research is not accurately portrayed in the research record. Dr. Hwang Woo-Suk, a South Korean stem cell researcher, gained international recognition for his groundbreaking work on cloning and stem cell research. Dr. Hwang had a claim to successfully clone human embryos and derived patient-specific stem cell lines, forwarding the field of regenerative medicine which was published in the Journal of Science. Dr. Kim Seon-Jung expressed his concerns regarding the accuracy of the research data and the ethical conduct of the experiments. Independent committees, as well as journalists, scrutinized the research data and methodology, leading to an eventual retraction of his work.

Ethical violations can fall under the following: altering or making up new data to meet a specific goal, adjusting how data is shown or explained, looking at data in a biased manner, and leaving out parts about data analysis and conclusions. Dr. Paolo Macchiarini is well-known within the scientific community as a thoracic surgeon and former regenerative researcher. Dr Macchiarini claimed to have made profound advancements in trachea transplantation by using synthetic tracheal scaffolds planted with the patient’s own stem cells. The goal was that the stem cells would eventually provide the patient with a suitable replacement trachea. Dr. Karl-Henrik Grinnemo, a member of Dr. Machiarini’s research team, raised concerns about the accuracy of the reported results and the ethical conduct of the experiments. Dr. Macchiarini’s ethical violations include exaggeration of success, failure to disclose the adverse post-operative effects, and complications of the surgery. Patients experienced severe health problems; several died post-surgery. The acts of Dr. Macchiarini led to the retractions of research articles from the Lancet, the termination of his academic positions, and criminal inquiries in Sweden. It also sparked concerns over the supervision and control of clinical trials utilizing experimental techniques.

=== Risks ===
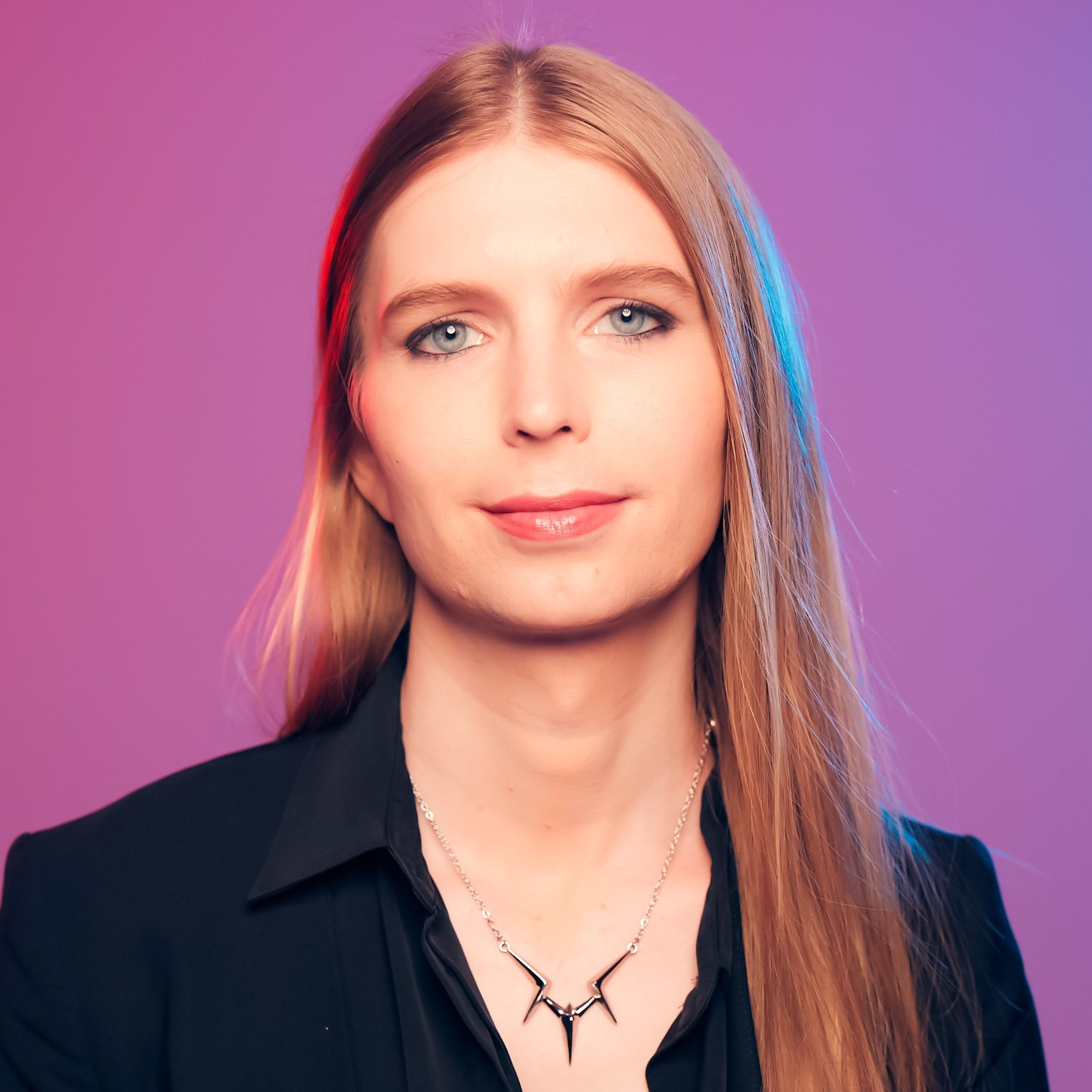
Chelsea Manning was charged with 22 offenses, including aiding the enemy, after leaking classified documents surrounding the United States' military presence in Iraq and Afghanistan.

Individual harm, damage to public trust, and threats to national security are three categories of harm that may come as a result of whistleblowing. Revealing a whistleblower's identity can automatically put their life in danger. Some media outlets associate words like "traitor" and "treason" with whistleblowers, and in many countries around the world, the punishment for treason is the death penalty, even if whoever allegedly committed treason may not have caused anyone physical harm. In some instances, whistleblowers must flee their country to avoid public scrutiny, threats of death or physical harm, and in some cases criminal charges.

Whistleblowers are often protected under law from employer retaliation, but in many cases, punishment such as termination, suspension, demotion, wage garnishment, and/or harsh mistreatment by other employees occurs. A 2009 study found that up to 38% of whistleblowers experienced professional retaliation in some form, including wrongful termination. Following dismissal, whistleblowers may struggle to find employment due to damaged reputations, poor references, and blacklisting. The socioeconomic impact of whistleblowing through loss of livelihood and family strain may also impact whistleblowers' psychological well-being. Whistleblowers often experience immense stress as a result of litigation regarding harms such as unfair dismissal, which they often face with little or no support from unions. Whistleblowers who continue to pursue their concerns may also face long battles with official bodies such as regulators and government departments. Such bodies may reproduce the "institutional silence" adopted by employers, adding to whistleblowers' stress and difficulties. Thus, whistleblowers often suffer great injustice that is never acknowledged or rectified.

In a few cases, however, harm is done by the whistleblower to innocent people. Whistleblowers can make unintentional mistakes, and investigations can be tainted by the fear of negative publicity. An example occurred in the Canadian health ministry, when a new employee wrongly concluded that nearly every research contract she saw in 2012 involved malfeasance. The result was the sudden firing of seven people, false and public threats of a criminal investigation, and the death of one researcher by suicide. The government ultimately paid the victims millions of dollars for lost pay, slander, and other harms, in addition to CA $2.41 million spent on the subsequent 2015 investigation into the false charges.

=== Attitudes toward whistleblowers ===
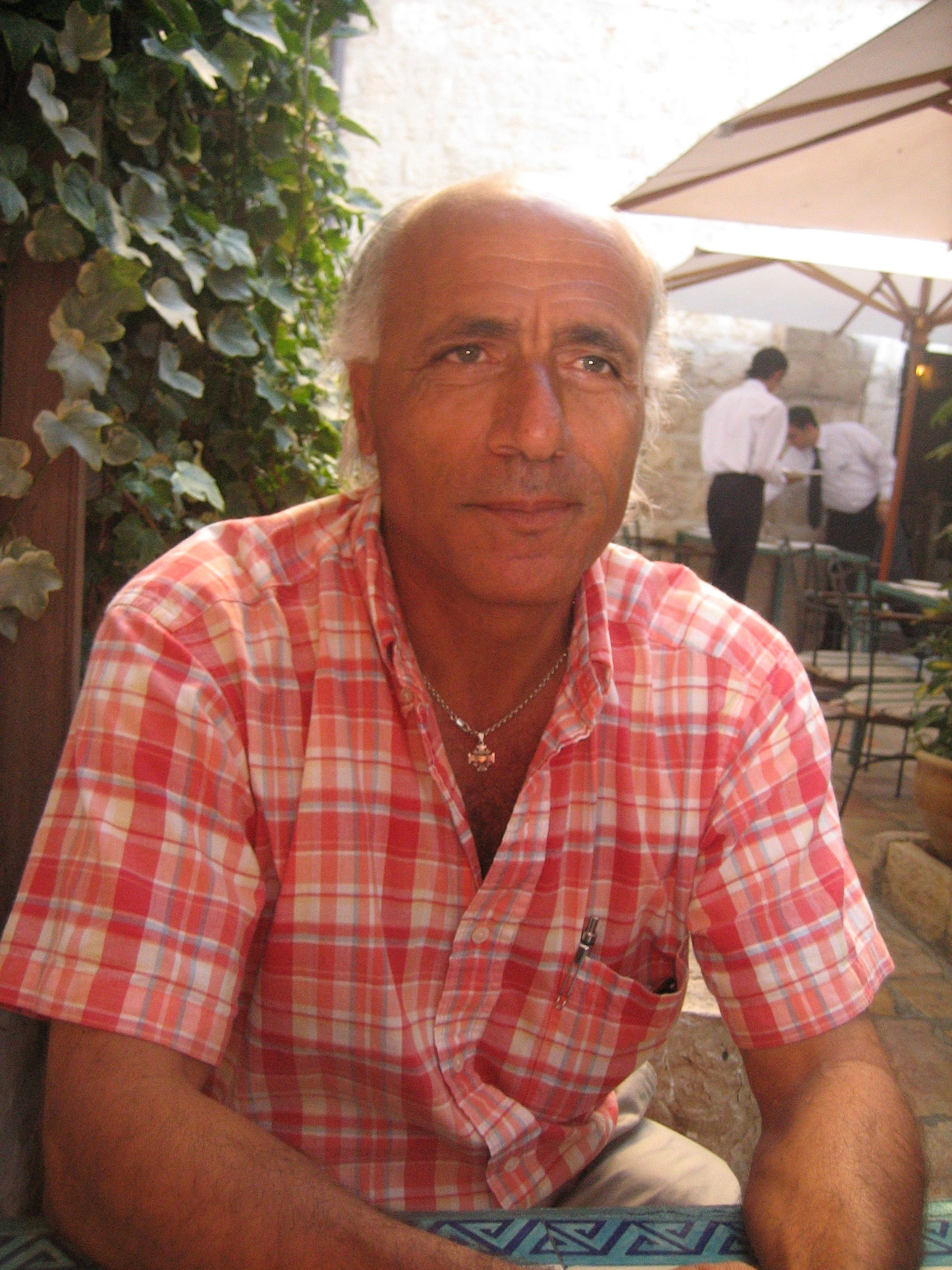
Mordechai Vanunu spent 18 years in prison, including more than 11 in solitary confinement.

Whistleblowers are seen by some as selfless martyrs for public interest and organizational accountability; others view them as "traitors" or "defectors". Some even accuse them of solely pursuing personal glory and fame, or view their behavior as motivated by greed in qui tam cases. Culturally, it still has connotations of betrayal, from "snitching" at one level to "denunciations" at the other. Speaking out is difficult, especially in a culture where this is not promoted or even actively discouraged. Some academics (such as Thomas Faunce) feel that whistleblowers should at least be entitled to a rebuttable presumption that they are attempting to apply ethical principles in the face of obstacles and that whistleblowing would be more respected in governance systems if it had a firmer academic basis in virtue ethics. Likely, many people do not even consider whistleblowing, not only because of fear of retaliation but also because of fear of losing relationships both at and outside work. According to 2025 Misconduct Research conducted by HR case management company HR Acuity, 22% of employees who witnessed or experienced misconduct stayed silent. 46% of employees who did not report cited fear of retaliation. This appears to be a realistic concern; less than half (46%) of employees were monitored for retaliation post-investigation.

Persecution of whistleblowers has become a serious issue in many parts of the world:

Employees in academia, business, or government might become aware of serious risks to health and the environment, but internal policies might pose threats of retaliation to those who report these early warnings. Private company employees in particular might be at risk of being fired, demoted, denied raises, and so on for bringing environmental risks to the attention of appropriate authorities. Government employees could be at a similar risk for bringing threats to health or the environment to public attention, although perhaps this is less likely.

There are examples of "early warning scientists" being harassed for bringing inconvenient truths about impending harm to the notice of the public and authorities. There have also been cases of young scientists being discouraged from entering controversial scientific fields for fear of harassment. To help whistleblowers, private organizations have formed whistleblower legal defense funds or support groups. Examples include the National Whistleblower Center in the United States and Whistleblowers UK. Depending on the circumstances, it is not uncommon for whistleblowers to be ostracized by their coworkers, discriminated against by future potential employers, or even fired from their organization. A campaign directed at whistleblowers to eliminate them from the organization is referred to as mobbing. It is an extreme form of workplace bullying wherein the group is set against the targeted individual.

=== Psychological impact ===
There is limited research on the psychological impacts of whistle-blowing. However, poor experiences with whistleblowing can cause a prolonged and prominent assault on the well-being of the whistleblower. As workers attempt to address concerns, they are often met with a wall of silence and hostility by management or colleagues. Depression is often reported by whistleblowers, and suicidal thoughts may occur in up to about 10%. General deterioration in health and self-care has been described. The range of symptomatology shares many of the features of posttraumatic stress disorder, though there is debate about whether the trauma experienced by whistleblowers meets diagnostic thresholds. Increased stress-related physical illness has also been described in whistleblowers.

The stresses involved in whistleblowing can be huge and may deter whistleblowing out of fear of failure and reprisals. Some whistleblowers speak of overwhelming and persistent distress, drug and alcohol problems, paranoid behavior at work, acute anxiety, nightmares, flashbacks, and intrusive thoughts. This fear may indeed be justified because an individual who feels threatened by whistleblowing may plan the career destruction of the "complainant" by reporting fictitious errors or rumors. This technique, labelled as "gaslighting", is a common approach used by organizations to manage employees who cause difficulty by raising concerns. In extreme cases, this technique involves the organization or manager proposing that the complainant's mental health is unstable. Organizations also often attempt to ostracize and isolate whistleblowers by undermining their concerns by suggesting that they are groundless, carrying out inadequate investigations, or ignoring them altogether. Whistleblowers may also be disciplined, suspended, and reported to professional bodies upon manufactured pretexts.

Such extreme experiences of threat and loss inevitably cause severe distress and sometimes mental illness, sometimes lasting for years afterwards. This mistreatment also deters others from coming forward with concerns. Thus, poor practices remain hidden behind a wall of silence, and prevent any organization from experiencing the improvements that may be afforded by intelligent failure. Some whistleblowers who break ranks with their organizations have had their mental stability questioned, such as Adrian Schoolcraft, the NYPD veteran who alleged falsified crime statistics in his department and was forcibly committed to a mental institution. Conversely, the emotional strain of a whistleblower investigation is devastating to the accused's family.

=== Ethics ===
Ethics is the set of moral principles that govern a person's or group's behavior. Deeper questions and theories of whistleblowing and why people choose to do so can be studied through an ethical approach. Whistleblowing is a topic of several myths and inaccurate definitions. Leading arguments in the ideological camp maintain that whistleblowing is the most basic of ethical traits and simply telling the truth to stop illegal, harmful activities or fraud against the government/taxpayers. In the opposite camp, many corporations and corporate or government leaders see whistleblowing as being disloyal for breaching confidentiality, especially in industries that handle sensitive client or patient information. Hundreds of laws grant protection to whistleblowers, but stipulations can easily cloud that protection and leave them vulnerable to retaliation and sometimes even threats and physical harm. However, the decision and action have become far more complicated with recent advancements in technology and communication.

The ethical implications of whistleblowing can be negative as well as positive. Some have argued that public sector whistleblowing plays an important role in the democratic process by resolving principal–agent problems. However, sometimes employees may blow the whistle as an act of revenge. Rosemary O'Leary explains this in her short volume on a topic called guerrilla government. "Rather than acting openly, guerrillas often choose to remain "in the closet", moving clandestinely behind the scenes, salmon swimming upstream against the current of power. Over the years, I have learned that the motivations driving guerrillas are diverse. The reasons for acting range from the altruistic (doing the right thing) to the seemingly petty (I was passed over for that promotion). Taken as a whole, their acts are as awe-inspiring as saving human lives out of a love of humanity and as trifling as slowing the issuance of a report out of spite or anger." For example, of the more than 1,000 whistleblower complaints that are filed each year with the Pentagon's Inspector General, about 97 percent are not substantiated. It is believed throughout the professional world that an individual is bound to secrecy within their work sector. Discussions of whistleblowing and employee loyalty usually assume that the concept of loyalty is irrelevant to the issue or, more commonly, that whistleblowing involves a moral choice that pits the loyalty that an employee owes an employer against the employee's responsibility to serve the public interest. Robert A. Larmer describes the standard view of whistleblowing in the Journal of Business Ethics by explaining that an employee possesses prima facie (based on the first impression; accepted as correct until proved otherwise) duties of loyalty and confidentiality to their employers and that whistleblowing cannot be justified except based on a higher duty to the public good. It is important to recognize that in any relationship which demands loyalty the relationship works both ways and involves mutual enrichment.

The ethics of Edward Snowden's actions have been widely discussed and debated in news media and academia worldwide. Snowden released classified intelligence to the American people in an attempt to allow Americans to see the inner workings of the government. A person is diligently tasked with the conundrum of choosing to be loyal to the company or to blow the whistle on the company's wrongdoing. Discussions on whistleblowing generally revolve around three topics: attempts to define whistleblowing more precisely, debates about whether and when whistleblowing is permissible, and debates about whether and when one has an obligation to blow the whistle.

=== Motivations ===
Many whistleblowers have stated that they were motivated to take action to put an end to unethical practices after witnessing injustices in their businesses or organizations. A 2009 study found that whistleblowers are often motivated to take action when they notice a sharp decline in ethical practices, as opposed to a gradual worsening. There are generally two metrics by which whistleblowers determine if a practice is unethical. The first metric involves a violation of the organization's bylaws or written ethical policies. These violations allow individuals to concretize and rationalize blowing the whistle. On the other hand, "value-driven" whistleblowers are influenced by their personal codes of ethics or by public service motivation which comes from an alignment of personal, cultural and organisational values. In these cases, whistleblowers have been criticized for being driven by personal biases.

In addition to ethics, social and organizational pressure are motivating forces. A 2012 study shows that individuals are more likely to blow the whistle when others know about the wrongdoing, because they fear the consequences of keeping silent. In cases where one person is responsible for wrongdoing, the whistleblower may file a formal report, rather than directly confronting the wrongdoer, because confrontation would be more emotionally and psychologically stressful. Furthermore, individuals may be motivated to report unethical behavior when they believe their organizations will support them. Professionals in management roles may feel responsibility to blow the whistle to uphold the values and rules of their organizations.

== Legal protection for whistleblowers ==
Legal protection for whistleblowers varies from country to country and may depend on the country of the original activity, where and how secrets were revealed, and how they eventually became published or publicized. Over a dozen countries have now adopted comprehensive whistleblower protection laws that create mechanisms for reporting wrongdoing and provide legal protections. Over 50 countries have adopted more limited protections as part of their anti-corruption, freedom of information, or employment laws. Additionally, beyond national legislations, international human rights law provides some protections to whistleblowers in recognition of their critical role in exposing human rights violations in public interest.

For purposes of the English Wikipedia, this section emphasizes the English-speaking world and covers other regimes only insofar as they represent exceptionally greater or lesser protections.

=== International Law ===
==== Treaties ====
While there is no single international treaty for whistleblower protection, several treaties provide such protection indirectly. Article 19 of the International Covenant on Civil and Political Rights (ICCPR) codifies the right to "seek, receive and impart information", which covers journalists' right to gather information, including from whistleblowers, as well as the public's right to receive such information through the media. The UN Human Rights Committee, in the case of Kouider Kerrouche v. Algeria, found that prosecuting an individual for exposing corruption violated Articles 17 (privacy) and 19 of the ICCPR, affirming that acts of whistleblowing can claim protection under the ICCPR.

Protections for whistleblowers are also included in treaties related to labour law and anti-corruption treaties, although these do not use the term "whistleblowing" expressly. Article 5(c) of the International Labour Organisation's Termination of Employment Convention, 1982, prohibits the termination of an employee for exposing violations of law by an employer. Article 33 of the United Nations Convention against Corruption (UNCAC), 2003, urges state parties to provide protections in their domestic laws against "unjustified treatment" of individuals who report corruption-related offences covered under the UNCAC.

==== United Nations Special Rapporteur Reports ====
In 2010, UN Special Rapporteur Martin Scheinin compiled best practices for respecting human rights while countering terrorism. This list included protecting members of intelligence agencies who disclosed wrongdoing by their agencies to the media or the public.

In 2013, following Edward Snowden's disclosures about the US' mass surveillance programmes, the UN High Commissioner for Human Rights, Navi Pillay, cautioned against reprisals faced by whistleblowers who revealed state misconduct. Pillay framed whistleblowing as a protected action of defending human rights, bringing it under the ambit of the UN Declaration of the Right and Responsibility of Individuals, Groups and Organs of Society to Promote and Protect Universally Recognised Human Rights and Fundamental Freedoms.

The same year, in 2013, global human rights experts published the Global Principles on National Security and the Right to Information, also known as the Tshwane Principles. These framed a set of international standards for preventing retaliation against individuals who disclosed information about wrongdoing by state actors, forming an explicit framework for balancing states' national security concerns with human rights and public interest considerations in such disclosures.

In 2015, UN Special Rapporteur David Kaye's report explicitly defined and protected whistleblowers within the framework of the ICCPR. Kaye argued in favour of whistleblowers' right to disclose information to the media, placing the burden of proof on states to show how a legitimate national security interest outweighed the public interest in any given instance of whistleblowing.

However, studies have revealed that despite the UN's consistent advocacy for whistleblower protections, whistleblowers within the UN are at risk of persecution themselves. In one survey, 12.8% of whistleblowers faced retaliation for reporting wrongdoing within the UN, while another study found that 57% of the surveyed staff believed the UN's work culture to be unfavourable for whistleblowing. Several whistleblowers who revealed mismanagement in the UN, including obfuscation of reports, corruption and sexual abuse, have been terminated or resigned due to ostracisation.

=== Australia ===
Various state laws were in existence before the federal Public Interest Disclosure Act 2013 introduced a new comprehensive framework for protecting Australian Government public sector whistleblowers.

The former Australian intelligence officer known as Witness K, who provided evidence of Australia's controversial spying operation against the government of East Timor in 2004, in 2018 faced the possibility of jail if convicted. Charges against Witness K were dropped on 7 July 2022 by new Attorney-General Mark Dreyfus SC using his reserve powers in the Judiciary Act 1903. Other whistleblowers include David McBride, who exposed crimes by the Australian Army in Afghanistan in 2018, and Richard Boyle, an employee at the Australian Taxation Office who exposed unethical debt collection practices in 2017. Boyle was released on a good behaviour bond after seven years with no conviction recorded, while McBride was sentenced to 5 years and 8 months in prison after six years. Whistleblowers Australia is an association for those who have exposed corruption or any form of malpractice, especially if they were then hindered or abused.

=== Canada ===
The Public Sector Integrity Commissioner (PSIC) provides a safe and confidential mechanism enabling public servants and the general public to disclose wrongdoings committed in the public sector. It also protects public servants who have disclosed wrongdoing and those who have cooperated in investigations from reprisal. The office's goal is to enhance public confidence in Canada's federal public institutions and in the integrity of public servants.

Mandated by the Public Servants Disclosure Protection Act, PSIC is a permanent and independent agent of Parliament. The act, which came into force in 2007, applies to most of the federal public sector, approximately 400,000 public servants. This includes government departments and agencies, parent Crown corporations, the Royal Canadian Mounted Police and other federal public sector bodies.

Not all disclosures lead to an investigation, as the Act sets out the jurisdiction of the commissioner and gives the option not to investigate under certain circumstances. On the other hand, if PSIC conducts an investigation and finds no wrongdoing was committed, the commissioner must report his findings to the discloser and to the organization's chief executive. Also, reports of wrongdoing are presented before the House of Commons and the Senate in accordance with the Act. The Act also established the Public Servants Disclosure Protection Tribunal (PSDPT) to protect public servants by hearing reprisal complaints referred by the Public Sector Integrity Commissioner. The tribunal can grant remedies in favour of complainants and order disciplinary action against persons who take reprisals.

=== European Union ===
The European Parliament approved a "Whistleblower Protection Directive" containing broad free speech protections for whistleblowers in both the public and the private sectors, including for journalists, in all member states of the European Union. The Directive prohibits direct or indirect retaliation against employees, current and former, in the public sector and the private sector. The Directive's protections apply to employees, to volunteers, and to those who assist them, including to civil society organizations and to journalists who report on their evidence. In October 2021, the EU Directorate-General for Justice and Consumers, Equality and the Rule of Law emphasized that ministries, as legal entities in the public sector, are also explicitly required to establish internal reporting channels for their employees. It provides equal rights for whistleblowers in the national security sector who challenge the denial or removal of their security clearances. Also, whistleblowers are protected from criminal prosecution and corporate lawsuits for damages resulting from their whistleblowing and are provided with psychological support for dealing with harassment stress.

Good government observers have hailed the EU directive as setting "the global standard for best practice rights protecting freedom of speech where it counts the most—challenging abuses of power that betray the public trust," according to the U.S.-based Government Accountability Project. They have noted, however, that ambiguities remain in the directive regarding application in some areas, such as "duty speech", that is, when employees report the same information in the course of a job assignment, for example, to a supervisor, instead of whistleblowing as formal dissent. In fact, duty speech is how the overwhelming majority of whistleblowing information gets communicated and where the free flow of information is needed for an organization's proper functioning. However, it is in response to such "duty speech" employee communication that the vast majority of retaliation against employees occurs. These observers have noted that the Directive must be understood as applying to protection against retaliation for such duty speech because without such an understanding the Directive will "miss the iceberg of what's needed".

The European Court of Human Rights has delivered landmark rulings on whistleblower protections under the European Convention of Human Rights. In Guja v. Moldova, the Court held that a public employee's contractual obligations of confidentiality could be outweighed by public interest in disclosing classified information, laying down rigorous standards for when a state could validly sanction a whistleblower. Subsequent judgements of the Court have elaborated on the scope of "public interest" to encompass matters which attract public attention or concern or affect citizens' well-being. Other protected disclosures include those that may give rise to significant controversy, relate to an important social issue or the functioning of public authorities in a democratic society, and spark public debate.

==== France ====
In France, several recent laws have established a protection regime for whistleblowers. Before 2016, there were several laws in force which created disparate legislation with sector-specific regimes. The 2016 law on transparency, the fight against corruption and modernization of economic life (known as the "Sapin 2 Law") provides for the first time a single legal definition of whistleblowers in France. It defines him or her as "an individual who discloses or reports, in a disinterested manner and in good faith, a crime or an offence, a serious and manifest breach of an international commitment duly ratified or approved by France, a unilateral act of an international organization adopted based on such a commitment, of the law or regulations, or a serious threat or harm to general interest, which he or she has become personally aware of." It excludes certain professional secrets such as national defense secrecy, medical secrecy or the secrecy of relations between a lawyer and his client.

In 2022, two laws were passed to transpose the European Directive 2019/1937 of 23 October 2019 on the protection of persons who report breaches of Union law. One of them strengthens the role of the Défenseur des droits – the French ombudsman – tasked with advising and protecting whistleblowers. The second amends the Sapin 2 law to bring it into line with the directive and adds substantial guarantees not included in the directive, among which:

- The definition of whistleblowing in force under the "Sapin 2 Law" – which includes whistleblowing not based on work – has been maintained.
- The protection applies to any natural person who facilitates or assists whistleblowers – as required in the directive – but also to entities such as NGOs (Non-governmental organizations) or trade unions, which act as a facilitator. They are offered the same level of protection.
- Military personnel will now be afforded the same level of protection as other civil servants, so long as they do not disclose information that may harm national security.
- The law provides that whistleblowers may be granted financial assistance when subjected to a suit, by making an application to a judge, who has the power to force the suing organization – the employer, for instance – to cover their legal fees and, if their financial situation has deteriorated, their living expenses.
- The law provides that whistleblowers shall not incur criminal liability with respect to the acquisition of, or access to, the information that is reported or publicly disclosed. They cannot be sentenced for any offenses committed to gather proof or information as long as they obtained it lawfully.
- The law strengthens existing sanctions against those who retaliate against whistleblowers: The criminal sanctions applicable to persons retaliating against whistleblowers can go up to three years of imprisonment and a fine of €45,000. The judges may impose €60,000 fines on companies taking a SLAPP action against a whistleblower.

The law allows any person to apply to the Défenseur des droits for an opinion on his or her status as a whistleblower. A response should be given within six months after receiving the application. The organic law provides that the Défenseur des droits will publish a report every two years on the overall functioning of whistleblower protection addressed to the French President of the Republic, the President of the National Assembly, and the President of the Senate.

=== Jamaica ===
In Jamaica, the Protected Disclosures Act, 2011 received assent in March 2011. It creates a comprehensive system for the protection of whistleblowers in the public and private sectors. It is based on the Public Interest Disclosure Act 1998.

=== India ===
The Government of India has been considering adopting a whistleblower protection law for several years. In 2003, the Law Commission of India recommended the adoption of the Public Interest Disclosure (Protection of Informers) Act, of 2002. In August 2010, the Public Interest Disclosure and Protection of Persons Making the Disclosures Bill, 2010 was introduced into the Lok Sabha, the lower house of the Parliament of India. The Bill was approved by the cabinet in June 2011. The Public Interest Disclosure and Protection of Persons Making the Disclosures Bill, 2010 was renamed the Whistleblowers' Protection Bill, 2011 by the Standing Committee on Personnel, Public Grievances, Law and Justice. The Whistleblowers' Protection Bill, 2011 was passed by the Lok Sabha on 28 December 2011. and by the Rajyasabha on 21 February 2014. The Whistle Blowers Protection Act, 2011 received Presidential assent on 9 May 2014, and the same was subsequently published in the official gazette of the Government of India on 9 May 2014 by the Ministry of Law and Justice, Government of India.

=== Iran ===
In 2023, the Iranian government made public whistleblowing punishable by law if a whistleblower reveals corruption to authorities that can't be proved.

=== Ireland ===
The government of Ireland committed to adopting a comprehensive whistleblower protection law in January 2012. The Protected Disclosures Act (PDA) was passed in 2014. The law covers workers in the public and private sectors, and also includes contractors, trainees, agency staff, former employees and job seekers. A range of different types of misconduct may be reported under the law, which provides protections for workers from a range of employment actions as well as whistleblowers' identities.

=== Netherlands ===
The Netherlands has measures in place to mitigate the risks of whistleblowing: The House for Whistleblowers (Huis voor klokkenluiders) offers advice and support to whistleblowers, and the Parliament passed a proposal in 2016 to establish this house for whistleblowers to protect them from the severe negative consequences that they might endure (Kamerstuk, 2013). Dutch media organizations also provide whistleblower support; on 9 September 2013, a number of major Dutch media outlets supported the launch of Publeaks, which provides a secure website for people to leak documents to the media. Publeaks is designed to protect whistleblowers. It operates on the GlobaLeaks software, which supports whistleblower-oriented technologies internationally.

=== New Zealand ===
In New Zealand, the Protected Disclosures (Protection of Whistleblowers) Act 2022 protects whistleblowers under some circumstances. A wide range of workers are covered, including employees, volunteers and contractors, and the legislation covers both public and private sector organisations. Protection is limited to serious misconduct and disclosure by workers. It does not cover others who learn of serious misconduct. To be protected by the Act, the disclosure must be to an Appropriate Authority. This means that disclosure to the media is not protected. Whistleblowers covered by the Act are protected from civil, criminal and disciplinary procedures as well as retaliation, and in most cases their identities must be kept confidential. The Act also requires that Public service agencies must have internal processes to support whistleblowing.

This Act replaced and extended the Protected Disclosures Act 2000. The genesis of the legislation was advocacy by Sir John Robertson in the 1980s, at the time New Zealand's Chief Ombudsman. The subsequent high-profile case of whistleblower Neil Pugmire who raised concerns about the release of dangerous mental health patients led to the 2000 act.

=== Switzerland ===
The Swiss Council of States agreed on a draft amendment of the Swiss Code of Obligations in September 2014. The draft introduces articles 321a^{bis} to 321a^{septies}, 328(3), 336(2)(d). An amendment of article 362(1) adds articles 321a^{bis} to 321a^{septies} to the list of provisions that may not be overruled by labour and bargaining agreements.
Article 321a^{ter} introduces an obligation on employees to report irregularities to their employer before reporting to an authority. An employee will, however, not breach her/his duty of good faith if she/he reports an irregularity to an authority and

- a period set by the employer and no longer than 60 days has lapsed since the employee has reported the incident to her/his employer, and
- the employer has not addressed the irregularity, or it is obvious that the employer has insufficiently addressed the irregularity.

Article 321a^{quarter} provides that an employee may exceptionally directly report to an authority. Exceptions apply in cases.

- where the employee is in a position to objectively demonstrate that a report to her/his employer will prove ineffective,
- where the employee has to anticipate dismissal,
- where the employee must assume that the competent authority will be hindered in investigating the irregularity, or
- where there is a direct and serious hazard to life, to health, to safety, or to the environment.

The draft does not improve on protection against dismissal for employees who report irregularities to their employer. The amendment does not provide for employees to anonymously file their observations of irregularities.

=== United Kingdom ===
Whistleblowing in the United Kingdom is protected by the Public Interest Disclosure Act 1998 (PIDA). Amongst other things, under the Act, protected disclosures are permitted even if a non-disclosure agreement has been signed between the employer and the former or current employee; a consultation on further restricting confidentiality clauses was held in 2019.

The Freedom to Speak Up Review sets out 20 principles to bring about improvements to help whistleblowers in the NHS, including:

- Culture of raising concerns – to make raising issues a part of the normal routine business of a well-led NHS organization.
- Culture free from bullying – freedom of staff to speak out relies on staff being able to work in a culture which is free from bullying.
- Training – every member of staff should receive training in their trust's approach to raising concerns and in receiving and acting on them.
- Support – all NHS trusts should ensure there is a dedicated person to whom concerns can be easily reported and without formality, a "speak up guardian".
- Support to find alternative employment in the NHS – where a worker who has raised a concern cannot, as a result, continue their role, the NHS should help them seek an alternative job.

Monitor produced a whistleblowing policy in November 2015 that all NHS organizations in England are obliged to follow. It explicitly says that anyone bullying or acting against a whistleblower could be potentially liable to disciplinary action. An observational and interviewed-based study of more than 80 Guardians found that a lack of resources, especially time, reduced their ability to respond to concerns, and to analyse and learn from data. Guardians struggled to develop their role, and create a more positive culture in which staff felt free to voice concerns. Guardians found their role stressful and received little psychological support and as a result many did not intend to stay in their role for long.

=== United States ===
Whistleblowing tradition in what would soon become the United States had a start in 1773 with Benjamin Franklin leaking a few letters in the Hutchinson affair. The release of the communications from royal governor Thomas Hutchinson to Thomas Whately led to a firing, a duel and arguably, both through the many general impacts of the leak and its role in convincing Franklin to join the radicals' cause, the taking of another important final step toward the American Revolution.

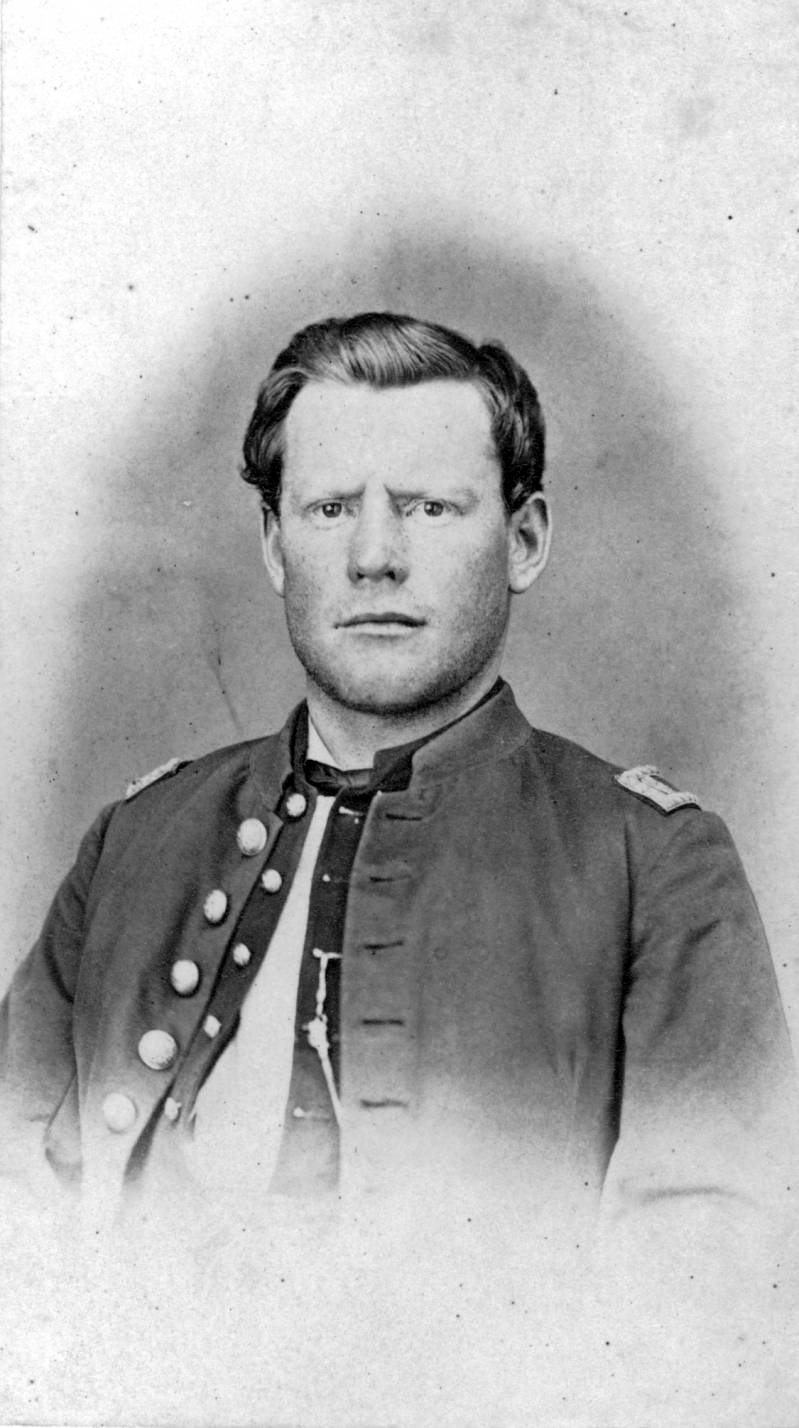
Silas Soule, a 19th century whistleblower of the Sand Creek massacre of Native Americans in 1864. Soule was murdered in what some believed was retaliation.

The first act of the Continental Congress in favor of what later came to be called whistleblowing came in the 1777-8 case of Samuel Shaw and Richard Marven. The two seamen accused Commander in Chief of the Continental Navy Esek Hopkins of torturing British prisoners of war. The Congress dismissed Hopkins and then agreed to cover the defense cost of the pair after Hopkins filed a libel suit against them under which they were imprisoned. Shaw and Marven were subsequently cleared in a jury trial.

To be considered a whistleblower in the United States, most federal whistleblower statutes require that federal employees have reason to believe their employer violated some law, rule, or regulation; testify in or commence a legal proceeding on the legally protected matter; or refuse to violate the law. In cases where whistleblowing on a specified topic is protected by statute, U.S. courts have generally held that such whistleblowers are protected from retaliation. However, a closely divided U.S. Supreme Court decision, Garcetti v. Ceballos (2006) held that the First Amendment free speech guarantees for government employees do not protect disclosures made within the scope of the employees' duties.

In the United States, legal protections vary according to the subject matter of the whistleblowing and sometimes the state where the case arises. In passing the 2002 Sarbanes–Oxley Act, the Senate Judiciary Committee found that whistleblower protections were dependent on the "patchwork and vagaries" of varying state statutes. Still, a wide variety of federal and state laws protect employees who call attention to violations, help with enforcement proceedings, or refuse to obey unlawful directions. While this patchwork approach has often been criticized, it is also responsible for the United States having more dedicated whistleblowing laws than any other country.

The first US law adopted specifically to protect whistleblowers was the 1863 United States False Claims Act (revised in 1986), which tried to combat fraud by suppliers of the United States government during the American Civil War. The act encourages whistleblowers by promising them a percentage of the money recovered by the government and by protecting them from employment retaliation. Another US law specifically protecting whistleblowers is the Lloyd–La Follette Act of 1912. It guaranteed the right of federal employees to furnish information to the United States Congress. The first US environmental law to include employee protection was the Clean Water Act of 1972. Similar protections are included in subsequent federal environmental laws, including the Safe Drinking Water Act (1974), Resource Conservation and Recovery Act (1976), Toxic Substances Control Act of 1976, Energy Reorganization Act of 1974 (through 1978 amendment to protect nuclear whistleblowers), Comprehensive Environmental Response, Compensation, and Liability Act (CERCLA, or the Superfund Law) (1980), and Clean Air Act (1990). Similar employee protections enforced through OSHA are included in the Surface Transportation Assistance Act (1982) to protect truck drivers, the Pipeline Safety Improvement Act (PSIA) of 2002, the Wendell H. Ford Aviation Investment and Reform Act for the 21st Century (AIR 21), and the Sarbanes–Oxley Act, enacted on July 30, 2002 (for corporate fraud whistleblowers). More recent laws with some whistleblower protection include the Patient Protection and Affordable Care Act (ACA), Consumer Product Safety Improvement Act (CPSIA), Seamans Protection Act as amended by the Coast Guard Authorization Act of 2010 (SPA), Consumer Financial Protection Act (CFPA), FDA Food Safety Modernization Act (FSMA), Moving Ahead for Progress in the 21st Century Act (MAP-21), and Taxpayer First Act (TFA).

Investigation of retaliation against whistleblowers under 23 federal statutes falls under the jurisdiction of the Directorate of Whistleblower Protection Program (DWPP) of the United States Department of Labor's Occupational Safety and Health Administration (OSHA). New whistleblower statutes enacted by Congress, which are to be enforced by the Secretary of Labor, are generally delegated by a Secretary's Order to the DWPP. The patchwork of laws means that victims of retaliation need to be aware of the laws at issue to determine the deadlines and means for making proper complaints. Some deadlines are as short as 10 days (Arizona State Employees have 10 days to file a "Prohibited Personnel Practice" Complaint before the Arizona State Personnel Board), while others are up to 300 days.

Those who report a false claim against the federal government, and suffer adverse employment actions as a result, may have up to six years (depending on state law) to file a civil suit for remedies under the US False Claims Act (FCA). Under a qui tam provision, the "source" for the report may be entitled to a percentage of what the government recovers from the offenders. However, the "source" must also be the first to file a federal civil complaint for recovery of the federal funds fraudulently obtained, and must avoid publicizing the claim of fraud until the US Justice Department decides whether to prosecute the claim itself. Such qui tam lawsuits must be filed under seal, using special procedures to keep the claim from becoming public until the federal government makes its decision on direct prosecution. Whistleblowers acting under the FCA are the primary enforcement tool used by the U.S. Department of Justice to target fraud, including overbilling to government programs like Medicare, Medicaid, and Tricare.

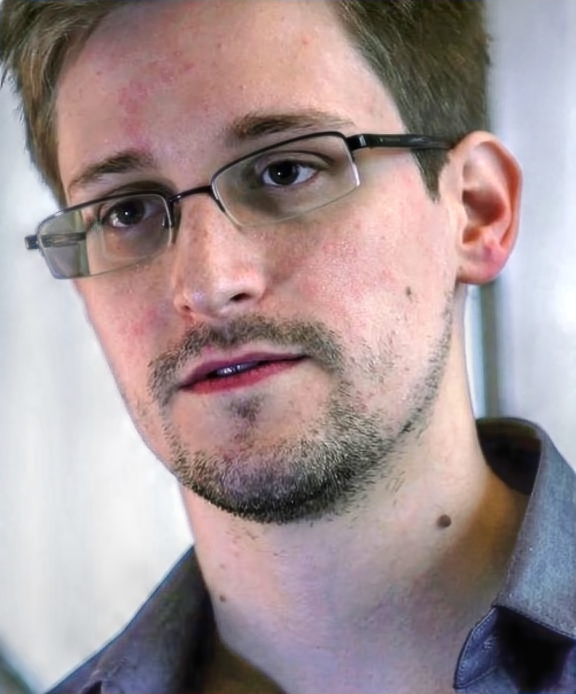
American whistleblower Edward Snowden

The Espionage Act of 1917 has been used to prosecute whistleblowers in the United States, including Edward Snowden and Chelsea Manning. In 2013, Manning was convicted of violating the Espionage Act and sentenced to 35 years in prison for leaking sensitive military documents to WikiLeaks. The same year, Snowden was charged with violating the Espionage Act for releasing confidential documents belonging to the NSA. Other laws have also been used to target whistleblowers. For example, President Trump created the Office of Accountability and Whistleblower Protection as a part of the Department of Veterans Affairs, which reportedly instead punished whistleblowers.

Section 922 of the Dodd–Frank Wall Street Reform and Consumer Protection Act (Dodd-Frank) in the United States incentivizes and protects whistleblowers. By Dodd-Frank, the U.S. Securities and Exchange Commission (SEC) and U.S. Commodity Futures Trading Commission (CFTC) financially reward whistleblowers for providing original information about violations of federal securities laws that result in sanctions of at least $1 million. Since its inception, the SEC whistleblower program has awarded almost $2 billion to whistleblowers who reported securities fraud to the agency. Additionally, Dodd-Frank offers job security to whistleblowers by illegalizing termination or discrimination due to whistleblowing. The whistleblower protection provision has proven successful; after the enactment of Dodd-Frank, the SEC charged KBR (company) and BlueLinx Holdings Inc. (company) with violating the whistleblower protection Rule 21F-17 by having employees sign confidentiality agreements that threatened repercussions for discussing internal matters with outside parties. President Donald Trump announced plans to dismantle Dodd-Frank in 2016. In addition to the Dodd-Frank programs and the False Claims Act, other U.S. agencies have their own whistleblower reward programs, including the Internal Revenue Service, the Financial Crimes Enforcement Network, the Department of Transportation, and two programs administered by the Department of Justice, one focused on corporate crime and the other on antitrust violations.

The US Department of Labor's Whistleblower Protection Program can handle many types of retaliation claims based on legal actions an employee took or was perceived to take in the course of their employment. Moreover, in the United States, if the retaliation occurred due to the perception of who the employee is as a person, the Equal Employment Opportunity Commission may be able to accept a complaint of retaliation.

The importance of whistleblowers has risen within the technology industry in particular as it has expanded in recent years. Prominent tech whistleblowers such as Frances Haugen, Mark MacGann, and Peiter "Mudge" Zatko have all come forward publicly to draw attention to particular problems at their companies. With technology companies increasingly acting as federal contractors, the importance of whistleblower laws to the industry continues to expand. Other scandals such as the Dragonfly search engine scandal and the Pompliano lawsuit against Snapchat have drawn attention to whistleblowers in technology. The federally recognized National Whistleblower Appreciation Day is observed annually on July 30, on the anniversary of the country's original 1778 whistleblower protection law.

=== Other countries ===
South Africa adopted legal protections for whistleblowers with the Protected Disclosures Act No. 26 of 2000 (PDA), in order "to shield employees from occupational detriment when reporting misconduct". The PDA was further strengthened by the passage of an Amendment Act in 2017.

Several other countries have adopted comprehensive whistleblower laws, including Ghana's Whistleblowers Act (Act 720), 2006. South Korea, Uganda, Kenya, and Rwanda also have Whistleblower laws. The European Court of Human Rights ruled in 2008 that whistleblowing was protected as freedom of expression.

Nigeria set up a whistleblowing policy against corruption and other ills. Nigeria formulated a Whistleblowing Policy in 2016, but this has not yet been established as law. A new draft bill for Whistle-blower Protection was approved by the Federal Executive Council (FEC) as of December 2022. The new draft whistleblower protection bill was presented to the National Assembly for consideration by President Muhammadu Buhari in May 2023. Buhari's term as President ends on May 29, 2023.

=== Advocacy for protection ===
Many NGOs advocate for stronger and more comprehensive legal rights and protections for whistleblowers. Among them are the Government Accountability Project (GAP), Blueprint for Free Speech,, the Open Democracy Advice Centre or in France, the Maison des Lanceurs d'Alerte (MLA). An international network – the Whistleblowing International Network (WIN) – aimed at gathering these NGOs. Frank Serpico, an NYPD whistleblower, prefers to use the term "lamp-lighter" to describe the whistleblower's role as a watchman. The Lamplighter Project, which aims to encourage law enforcement officers to report corruption and abuse of power and helps them do so, is named based on Serpico's usage of the term.

== Methods used ==
Whistleblowers who may be at risk from those they are exposing are now using encryption methods and anonymous content-sharing software to protect their identity. Tor, a highly accessible anonymity network, is frequently used by whistleblowers around the world. Tor has undergone several large security updates to protect the identities of potential whistleblowers who may wish to leak information anonymously.

Specialized whistleblowing software has been built on top of the Tor technology to incentivize and simplify its adoption for secure whistleblowing. Considering the risks faced by whistleblowers, most whistleblowing software has been developed as open-source projects, allowing for public audits and transparency. Built on well-defined design principles, examples include GlobaLeaks and SecureDrop.

=== Whistleblowing hotline ===
In business, whistleblowing hotlines are usually deployed to mitigate risk, with the intention of providing secure, anonymous reporting for employees or third-party suppliers who may otherwise be fearful of reprisals from their employer. As such, implementing a corporate whistleblowing hotline is often seen as a step toward compliance and can also highlight an organization's stance on ethics. It is widely agreed that implementing a dedicated service for whistleblowers has a positive effect on organizational culture.

A whistleblowing hotline is sometimes also referred to as an ethics hotline or "Speak Up" hotline and is often facilitated by an outsourced service provider to encourage potential disclosers to come forward. In 2018, the Harvard Business Review published findings to support the idea that whistleblowing hotlines are crucial to keeping companies healthy, stating, "More whistles blown are a sign of health, not illness."

== In popular culture ==
One of the subplots for season 6 of the popular American TV show The Office focuses on Andy Bernard, a salesman, discovering that his company's printers catch on fire, his struggling with how to deal with the news, and the company's response to the whistleblower going public. The 1998 film Star Trek: Insurrection involves Picard and the NCC-1701-E Enterprise crew risking their Starfleet careers to blow the whistle on a Federation conspiracy with the Son'a to forcibly relocate the Ba'ku from their planet.

In 2014, the rock/industrial band Laibach released a song titled "The Whistleblowers" on their eighth studio album, Spectre. It was released on 3 March 2014 under Mute Records.

In 2016, the rock band Thrice released a song titled "Whistleblower" on the album To Be Everywhere Is to Be Nowhere. The song is written from the perspective of Edward Snowden.

In July 2018, CBS debuted a reality television show titled Whistleblower, hosted by lawyer, former judge, and police officer Alex Ferrer, that covers qui tam suits under the False Claims Act against companies that have allegedly defrauded the federal government.

== See also ==
- Informant
- Supergrass (informer)
- Benetech Martus
- Complaint system
- Conflict of interest
- ECC: Leniency policy
- False Claims Act
- GlobaLeaks
- List of nuclear whistleblowers
- List of whistleblowers
- List of EPA whistleblowers
- Misplaced loyalty
- Nuclear whistleblowers
- Organizational retaliatory behavior
- Right to privacy
- SEC Office of the Whistleblower
- SecureDrop
- Shooting the messenger
- Vigilante
- Whistleblower Office

== Bibliography ==
- Alford, C. Fred (2001). Whistleblowers: Broken Lives and Organizational Power. Cornell University Press. ISBN 978-0-8014-3841-7.
- Arnold, Jason Ross (2019). Whistleblowers, Leakers, and Their Networks: From Snowden to Samizdat. Rowman & Littlefield.
- Banisar, David "Whistleblowing: International Standards and Developments", in Corruption and Transparency: Debating the Frontiers between State, Market and Society, I. Sandoval, ed., World Bank-Institute for Social Research, UNAM, Washington, D.C., 2011, available online at ssrn.com
- Bazzichelli, Tatiana, ed. (2021). Whistleblowing for Change. Exposing Systems of Power and Injustice. transcript Verlag. ISBN 978-3-8376-5793-7. (Open Access)
- Ceva, Emanuela and Bocchiola, Michele (2018). Is Whistleblowing a duty?, Cambridge: Polity Press.
- Dempster, Quentin Whistleblowers, Sydney, ABC Books, 1997. ISBN 0-7333-0504-0 [See especially pp. 199–212: 'The Courage of the Whistleblowers']
- Frais, A "Whistleblowing heroes – boon or burden?", Bulletin of Medical Ethics, 2001 Aug:(170):13–19.
- Garrett, Allison, "Auditor Whistle Blowing: The Financial Fraud Detection and Disclosure Act," 17 Seton Hall Legis. J. 91 (1993).
- Hesch, Joel (2009). Whistleblowing: A guide to government reward programs. Goshen Press. ISBN 978-0-9772602-0-1.
- Hunt, Geoffrey (2006). "The Principle of Complementarity: Freedom of Information, Public Accountability and Whistleblowing in". Chapman, R & Hunt, M (eds) Freedom of Information: Perspectives on Open Government in a Theoretical and Practical Context. Ashgate Publishing, Aldershot, UK.
- Hunt, Geoffrey (2000). "Whistleblowing, Accountability & Ethical Accounting". Clinical Risk. 6 (3): 115–16. doi:10.1177/135626220000600306. S2CID 79063742.
- Hunt, Geoffrey (1998). 'Whistleblowing', commissioned entry for Encyclopedia of Applied Ethics, (8,000 words). Academic Press, California, USA.
- Hunt, Geoffrey, ed. (1998). Whistleblowing in the Social Services: Public Accountability & Professional Practice. Arnold.
- Hunt, G, ed. (1995). Whistleblowing in the Health Service: Accountability, Law & Professional Practice. Arnold.
- Johnson, Roberta Ann (2002). Whistleblowing: When It Works—And Why. L. Reinner Publishers. ISBN 978-1-58826-114-4.
- Kohn, Stephen M (2000). Concepts and Procedures in Whistleblower Law. Quorum Books. ISBN 978-1-56720-354-7.
- Kohn, Stephen M; Kohn, Michael D; Colapinto, David K. (2004). Whistleblower Law A Guide to Legal Protections for Corporate Employees. Praeger Publishers. ISBN 978-0-275-98127-3.
- Lauretano, Major Daniel A., "The Military Whistleblower Protection Act and the Military Mental Health Protection Act", Army Law, (Oct) 1998.
- Lechner, Jay P. & Paul M. Sisco, "Sarbanes-Oxley Criminal Whistleblower Provisions & the Workplace: More Than Just Securities Fraud" 80 Florida B. J. 85 (June 2006)
- Lipman, Frederick D. (2012). Whistleblowers: Incentives, Disincentives, and Protection Strategies. John Wiley & Sons. ISBN 978-1-118-09403-7.
- Martin, Brian. Justice Ignited: The Dynamics of Backfire, (Lanham, MD: Rowman & Littlefield, 2007).
- Martin, Brian with Wendy Varney. Nonviolence Speaks: Communicating against Repression, (Cresskill, NJ: Hampton Press, 2003).
- Martin, Brian. Technology for Nonviolent Struggle, (London: War Resisters' International, 2001).
- Martin, Brian with Lyn Carson. Random Selection in Politics, (Westport, CT: Praeger, 1999).
- Martin, Brian. The Whistleblower's Handbook: How to Be an Effective Resister, (Charlbury, UK: Jon Carpenter; Sydney: Envirobook, 1999). Updated and republished 2013 as Whistleblowing: a practical guide, Sparsnäs, Sweden: Irene Publishing.
- McCarthy, Robert J. "Blowing in the Wind: Answers for Federal Whistleblowers", 3 William & Mary Policy Review 184 (2012).
- Miethe, Terance D (1991). Whistleblowing at work: tough choices in exposing fraud, waste, and abuse on the job. Westview Press. ISBN 978-0-8133-3549-0.
- Rowe, Mary & Bendersky, Corinne, "Workplace Justice, Zero Tolerance and Zero Barriers: Getting People to Come Forward in Conflict Management Systems," in Negotiations and Change, From the Workplace to Society, Thomas Kochan and Richard Locke (eds), Cornell University Press, 2002
- Wilkey, Robert N. Esq., "Federal Whistleblower Protection: A Means to Enforcing Maximum Hour Legislation for Medical Residents", William Mitchell Law Review, Vol. 30, Issue 1 (2003).
- Engineering Ethics concepts and cases by Charles E. Harris, Jr. – Michael S. Pritchard- Michael J. Rabins.
- IRS.gov, Whistleblower – Informant Award
- Whistleblower& Laws Australia – Global and Australian Laws: Steven Asnicar, 2019
