= Christiane Ouimet =

1st Public Sector Integrity Commissioner
- In office 2007–2010

Personal details
- Born: St. Albert, Ontario, Canada
- Education: University of Ottawa
- Website: Public Sector Integrity Commissioner

Christiane Ouimet (born in St. Albert, Ontario, Canada) is a retired Canadian civil servant. She was the first Public Sector Integrity Commissioner of Canada. She retired on October 18, 2010.

Canada's Auditor General report released on December 9, 2010, alleged that the former watchdog commissioner intimidated employees and engaged in "retaliatory actions" and may have breached the Privacy Act. This report also stated that "allegations made by the former PSIC employee that the Commissioner undertook a series of retaliatory actions against him because she believed that he had complained about her to the Auditor General and that he had cooperated in our audit are founded."

== Career ==
A graduate of the University of Ottawa, Ouimet holds an Honours degree and two bachelor's degrees in Law (Civil Law and Common Law). A member of the Law Society of Upper Canada since 1982, Ouimet has worked for the federal government for 25 years, in eight different departments and agencies, primarily in the areas of audit, regulatory affairs, policing and enforcement, quasi-judicial functions and machinery of government. She held the position of Executive Director of the Immigration and Refugee Board, the largest administrative tribunal in Canada. She also served as Associate Deputy Minister at Public Works and Government Services Canada and at Agriculture and Agri-Food Canada.

Ouimet was appointed by a unanimous resolution of the Senate and House of Commons of the Canadian Parliament and took office in August 2007. As an Agent of Parliament, Ouimet reported directly to Parliament. She was responsible for the administration of the Public Servants Disclosure Protection Act, which establishes a procedure for the disclosure of wrongdoings in the public sector, including the protection of persons who disclose wrongdoing.

In October 2010 it was announced that the Office of the Public Sector Integrity Commissioner was being investigated by the office of the Auditor General of Canada. At the same time, it was announced that Ouimet was retiring. After failing to appear before the political Public Accounts Committee, in February 2011, Ouimet was again summoned to appear before the Committee. She appeared before the Committee to provide sworn testimony on March 10, 2011.
