= Lobbying Act (Canada) =

Canadian statute regulating lobbying

Lobbying Act, 1985

Parliament of Canada
- Long title: An Act respecting lobbying
- Citation: R.S.C., 1985, c. 44 (4th Supp.)
- Enacted by: Parliament of Canada
- Enacted: 1985
- Assented to: September 13, 1988

Legislative history
- First reading: House: / Senate:
- Second reading: House: / Senate:
- Third reading: House: / Senate:
- Committee report: House: / Senate:

Amended by
- Federal Accountability Act
- Status: Amended

The Lobbying Act (French: Loi sur le lobbying) is an Act of the Parliament of Canada which regulates lobbying of public office holders. The Act has been amended many times over Canada's history.

The office of the Commissioner of Lobbying of Canada is an independent Agent of Parliament responsible for administering the provisions of the Lobbying Act and the Lobbyists' Code of Conduct (the Code) to ensure that the process is both transparent and ethical. On July 2, 2008, the Lobbyists' Code of Conduct (the Code) requirement that all lobbyists register under the Lobbying Act, came into force. The Office maintains a searchable, self-reported lobbyists' registry, provides education, and verifies compliance. Each fiscal year the Commissioner submits an annual report to the Parliament of Canada on the administration of the Act.

The Lobbying Act gives the Commissioner of Lobbying the authority to develop, administer, and update the Code. The first version of the Code, which came into effect on March 1, 1997, was updated in 2015 following consultation with the public. On November 7, 2015, the Code was published in the Canada Gazette after it was reviewed by the House of Commons Standing Committee on Access to Information, Privacy and Ethics in the spring of 2015. This revised version came into force on December 1, 2015.

The Office of the Commissioner replaced the Office of the Registrar of Lobbyists.

== Sections of the Lobbying Act ==
Under section 11 of the Lobbying Act, the Commissioner must prepare and submit an annual report on the administration of the Act within three months after the end of each fiscal year and submit it to the Speaker of the Senate and the Speaker of the House of Commons.

Sections 5 and 7 provide details on requirements of individual lobbyists to register or be listed.

== Public office holders ==
Under the Lobbying Act, public office holders include members, staff and employees of various bodies, agencies, and departments, such as the House of Commons, the Canadian Armed Forces, the Royal Canadian Mounted Police, federal ministers, and Governor in Council appointees.

== Lobbyists registrars and commissioners network (LRCN) ==
In Canada, the Lobbyists registrars and commissioners network (LRCN) includes the federal Office of the Commissioner of Lobbying as well as some provincial and municipal offices and agencies. As of 2020, participating provinces, territories and municipalities included Alberta's Lobbyist Registry, Office of the Ethics Commissioner, British Columbia's Office of the Registrar of Lobbyists. Manitoba's Office of the Lobbyist Registrar, New Brunswick's Office of the Integrity Commissioner, Newfoundland and Labrador's Commissioner of Lobbyists, Nova Scotia's Registry of Lobbyists, Ontario's Office of the Integrity Commissioner, Prince Edward Island's Lobbyists Registry, Saskatchewan's Office of the Registrar of Lobbyists, Québec's Commissioner of Lobbying, the Yukon's Registry of lobby and the Conflict of Interest Commissioner, the Municipal City of Ottawa's Lobbyist Registry, and the City of Toronto's Office of the Lobbyist Registrar. Their 2021 conference as hosted by the Canadian Intergovernmental Conference Secretariat (CICS). Issues discussed included elections, jurisdictional and legislative changes related to lobbying.

== See also ==
- Federal Accountability Act
