= Records of members of the parliament of Canada =

This is a list of records relating to members of the Parliament of Canada.

== Age ==
=== Youngest ===
The youngest ever MP is currently the former New Democratic Party MP Pierre-Luc Dusseault, elected in the 2011 Canadian federal election at the age of 19 years and 11 months for the riding of Sherbrooke. The 2011 election chose the House members of the 41st Parliament. Dusseault succeeded former Liberal Party MP, Claude-André Lachance, who was elected in the 1974 federal election, as the youngest MP in Canadian history. Lachance was 20 years and 3 months old when elected; he set the record when he was elected for the riding of Lafontaine in the 30th Parliament.

At age 20, Laurin Liu was elected to Parliament at the 2011 Canadian federal election. She represented the riding Rivière-des-Mille-Îles. In the same election, Charmaine Borg, only 10 days older than Liu, won election to Parliament as the representative of Terrebonne—Blainville. Other women under the age of 24 elected to the same parliament include Ève Péclet, at 21, for La Pointe-de-l'Île, and Mylène Freeman, 22, for Argenteuil—Papineau—Mirabel. All four of these MPs were New Democrats.

=== Oldest ===
The oldest MP was William Anderson Black, a Conservative who was first elected to the House of Commons of Canada in a 1923 by-election for the riding of Halifax. At the time of election, Mr. Black was 76 years, 1 month, and 26 days old. He held his seat until his death on 1 September 1934 at the age of 86 years, 10 months and 22 days. Black began his service partway through the 14th Parliament and ended it when he died partway through the 17th Parliament.

== Period of service ==
=== Longest ===
Wilfrid Laurier was an MP for 44 years and 11 months between January 22, 1874, when he won at the riding of Drummond—Arthabaska, and February 17, 1919, when he died in office, although his tenure was not continuous. He did serve continuously for 41 years and 2 months from November 28, 1877, to February 17, 1919, at Quebec East. During this period, he served as leader of the Liberal Party, in opposition and government. Laurier's parliamentary service encompassed most of the 3rd Parliament and every subsequent parliament until he died during the 13th. The longest serving undefeated MP is Louis Plamondon who has served as an MP since September 4, 1984, to the present day, making him also the MP with the longest continuous service.

Mackenzie Bowell served as a parliamentarian continuously for over 50 years. Bowell was elected to the 1st Canadian Parliament in 1867 and served continuously as the Conservative MP for Hastings North until 1892, during the 7th Parliament, when Prime Minister John Abbott recommended his appointment to the Senate. Bowell retained his position in Cabinet and became Leader of the Government in the Senate in 1893. While a senator, he served as the Prime Minister of Canada from 1894 to 1896. After resigning as Prime Minister amidst a leadership crisis over the Manitoba Schools Question, he continued to serve in the Senate until his death in 1917, marking a record 50 years, 2 months, and 4 days of continuous service throughout the first half-century of Canada's history.

=== No period of service ===
John Dahmer died on 26 November 1988, five days after being elected in the general election to choose the members of the 34th Canadian Parliament, before he could be officially sworn in as an MP. Had he taken his seat, Dahmer would have represented the Beaver River constituency as a Progressive Conservative.

== Related link ==
- Electoral firsts in Canada
