= Whistle-blowing policy in Nigeria =

Whistle-blowing Policy in Nigeria is an anti-corruption programme that encourages people to voluntarily disclose information about fraud, bribery, looted government funds, financial misconduct, government assets, and any other form of corruption or theft to the Nigeria's Federal Ministry of Finance. A whistle-blower who provides information about any financial mismanagement or tip about any stolen funds to the ministry's portal is rewarded or entitled to 2.5%–5% of the recovered funds by the Nigerian government. The policy was launched on December 21, 2016 by Nigeria's Federal Government and facilitated through the Federal Ministry of Finance.

== Funds recovered through the whistle-blowing policy ==
It was reported that within the first two months of the Whistle-blowing policy in Nigeria, that Nigeria's Federal Government recovered over $178 million that was stolen from the government. By June 5, 2017, the Federal Ministry of Finance received a total of 2,150 tips from the public. 128 tips came through the website of the ministry, 1,192 through phone calls, 540 through SMS, and 290 through email to the ministry. By July/August 2017, a total of 5000 tips had been received. In October 2017, the Acting Chairman of the Economic and Financial Crimes Commission (EFCC), Ibrahim Magu, said that N527,643,500; $53,222.747; GBP21,222,890 and Euro 547,730 had been recovered since the policy was launched.

== Ikoyi Whistle-blower ==
In 2017, a whistler-blower helped the Nigerian government recover 43.5million, GBP27,800, and N23.2 million at No. 16 Osborne Road, Ikoyi, Lagos, Nigeria. It was also reported that the Federal Ministry of Finance paid the whistler-blower the sum of N421 million.

== Whistle-blower Protection ==
To protect whistle-blowers, civil society organizations have engaged in a number of advocacy efforts to ensure that people who blow whistles are protected. The MacArthur Foundation is currently funding the African Centre for Media & Information Literacy (AFRICMIL) to launch a whistle-blower campaign known as Corruption Anonymous.

== Criticism ==
Health advocates have urged the Nigerian government to use the recovered funds to fund immunization and other health issues in Nigeria.
