= Joe Friday (public servant) =

3rd Public Sector Integrity Commissioner of Canada

3rd Public Sector Integrity Commissioner of Canada
- Incumbent
- Assumed office 27 March 2015
- Preceded by: Mario Dion

Joe Friday is the current Public Sector Integrity Commissioner of Canada.

== Education ==
Friday holds a Bachelor of Journalism (Honours) from Carleton University and a Bachelor of Laws from the University of Ottawa.

== Career ==
Prior to his appointment, Friday served as Deputy Public Sector Integrity Commissioner from 2011 until his appointment in 2015.

Prior to joining the public service, Friday practiced law at the firm Osler, Hoskin & Halcourt.

== Appointment ==
Friday was appointed as Public Sector Integrity Commissioner of Canada on March 27, 2015.
