= Auditor General Act =

Act of Parliament respecting the office of the Auditor General of Canada

Parliament of Canada
- Long title: An Act respecting the office of the Auditor General of Canada and sustainable development monitoring and reporting
- Citation: Auditor General Act (R.S.C., 1985, c. A-17)
- Enacted by: Parliament of Canada
- Assented to: 1985

The Auditor General Act (French: Loi sur le vérificateur général) is an Act of Parliament respecting the office of the Auditor General of Canada and sustainable development monitoring and reporting.
