= Public Sector Integrity Commissioner =

Canadian government accountability agency

Public Sector Integrity Commissioner of Canada
- Commissariat à l’intégrité du secteur public du Canada
- Incumbent; Harriet Solloway since September 27, 2023
- Abbreviation: PSIC
- Reports to: Parliament of Canada
- Nominator: Prime Minister of Canada
- Appointer: Governor in Council
- Term length: 7 years renewable once
- Constituting instrument: Public Servants Disclosure Protection Act
- First holder: Christiane Ouimet

Office of the Public Sector Integrity Commissioner of Canada
- Bureau du Commissaire à l'intégrité du secteur public

Agency overview
- Formed: 2007
- Headquarters: Ottawa, Ontario, Canada
- Employees: 28
- Annual budget: $5.6 million (2019)
- Website: www.psic-ispc.gc.ca/en

The Office of the Public Sector Integrity Commissioner of Canada is one of the Independent Oversight Offices created by the Public Servants Disclosure Protection Act (PSPD Act) as part of the Canadian Federal Accountability Act. The Office investigates wrongdoing in the federal public sector and helps protect whistleblowers, and those who participate in investigations, from reprisal. Harriet Solloway is the current Commissioner, named on September 27, 2023.

The Act is intended to address wrongdoing that could seriously impact the public's confidence in the integrity of the public service. Reports of founded wrongdoing are presented before the House of Commons and the Senate in accordance with the Public Servants Disclosure Protection Act.

== History ==
The Office is an independent federal organization created in 2007 under the PSDP Act, is led by a Commissioner who reports directly to Parliament, and has jurisdiction over most federal public sector organizations, including the Royal Canadian Mounted Police and Crown Corporations. The Canadian Forces, the Canadian Security Intelligence Service and the Communications Security Establishment are exempt but must establish their own internal disclosure regime.

=== Commissioners ===
Christiane Ouimet became the first Public Sector Integrity Commissioner when the post was created by the Public Servants Disclosure Protection Act (S.C. 2005, c. 46) on August 6, 2007. Ms. Ouimet retired effective October 18, 2010, amid an investigation on her behaviour in the workplace.

She was replaced by Mario Dion, a former federal parole board chair, was named as the second Public Sector Integrity Commissioner on December 14, 2010. In 2014, Michael Ferguson, Canada's former auditor general, publicly rebuked Dion's performance as the Public Sector Integrity Commissioner of Canada, an office that is supposed to protect public servants who blow the whistle on wrongdoing within the federal government. Dion was appointed commissioner by the Harper Government after the previous commissioner resigned amid complaints about the office. He left office later that year.

Joe Friday was appointed commissioner by Harper Government in March 2015 for a seven-year tenure and by the Trudeau Government in March 2022 for a 18-month tenure.

Commissioner	Nominated by	Assumed office	left office
Christiane Ouimet	Stephen Harper	August 6, 2007	October 18, 2010
Mario Dion	Stephen Harper	December 14, 2010	2014
Joe Friday	Stephen Harper and Justin Trudeau	March 27, 2015	September 26, 2023
Harriet Solloway	Justin Trudeau	September 27, 2023	

== Disclosures of Wrongdoing (Whistleblowing) ==
A protected disclosure is defined in the PSPD Act as a disclosure made by a public servant of any information that he or she believes could show that a wrongdoing was committed or is about to be committed in the federal public sector, or that could show that the public servant has been asked to commit a wrongdoing.

A disclosure is protected if it is made in good faith to the public servant's supervisor, to his/her organization's designated Senior Officer for internal disclosure, or to the Office of the Public Sector Integrity Commissioner.

Wrongdoing is defined as follows:

- a contravention of any Act of Parliament or of the legislature of a province or any regulations made under any such act;
- a misuse of public funds or a public asset;
- a gross mismanagement in the federal public sector;
- an act or omission that creates a substantial and specific danger to the life, health or safety of persons, or to the environment, other than a danger that is inherent in the performance of the duties or functions of a public servant;
- a serious breach of a code of conduct established under section 5 or 6;
- knowingly directing or counseling a person to commit a wrongdoing as defined above.

If, after an investigation, the Commissioner finds that wrongdoing was committed, he/she must table a Case Report of founded wrongdoing in the House of Commons and the Senate in accordance with the PSPD Act.

As of October 2017, a total of 15 reports have been tabled in Parliament.

Following an investigation, launched as a result of an internal disclosure, which results in a finding of wrongdoing, the Chief Executive of the respective organization must promptly provide public access to information about the wrongdoing found and the recommendations for corrective action, if any.

== Reprisals ==
Whether a disclosure is made internally or to PSIC, public sector employees are protected from reprisal by the Act.

Under the Act, “reprisal” is defined as any of the following measures taken against a public servant because the public servant has made a protected disclosure or has, in good faith, cooperated in an investigation into a disclosure or an investigation commenced under section 33:

- a disciplinary measure
- the demotion of the public servant
- the termination of employment of the public servant, including, in the case of a member of the RCMP, a discharge or dismissal
- any measure that adversely affects the employment or working conditions of the public servant
- a threat to take any measures referred to above

For it to be considered reprisal under the Act, there must be a link between the alleged reprisal actions and the making of a disclosure of wrongdoing or participating in an investigation. The Act states that disclosers must contact the Office within 60 days of knowing that they have had a reprisal committed against them. The Commissioner must make a decision whether to investigate within 15 days of the complaint being filed and when all the necessary information to complete the assessment has been received. If the investigation leads the Commissioner to believe a reprisal has occurred, he will refer the case to a tribunal composed of provincial and federal judges. The Public Servants Disclosure Protection Tribunal has the power to order an appropriate remedy for victims of reprisal.
