= Parliament of Canada Act =

Canadian law regulating federal parliament

Parliament of Canada
- Long title: An Act respecting the Parliament of Canada
- Citation: R.S.C., 1985, c. P-1
- Status: Current legislation

The Parliament of Canada Act (French: Loi sur le Parlement du Canada) is an Act of the Parliament of Canada to define the rules, customs and regulations of the Parliament of Canada itself.

The Parliament of Canada was defined in the 1867 Constitution Act forming Canada. The rules were defined as following the Parliament of Great Britain and Ireland. The rules were to be updated from time to time by the Parliament of Canada, but not exceeding the Parliament of Great Britain and Ireland:

"The privileges, immunities, and powers to be held, enjoyed. and exercised by the Senate and by the House of Commons, and by the Members thereof respectively, shall be such as are from time to time defined by Act of the Parliament of Canada. but so that the same shall never exceed those at the passing of this Act held, enjoyed, and exercised by the Commons House of Parliament of the United Kingdom of Great Britain and Ireland, and by the Members thereof"

== Sections ==
=== Part I - Senate and House of Commons ===
Parliament will continue upon the death of the Monarch, but this does not impinge on the right of the Crown to prorogue or dissolve Parliament. Parliament members shall have the same privileges as those of the House of Commons of Great Britain and Ireland at the time of Confederation.

=== Part II - Senate ===
In this section, rules specific to the Senate and its operation are set out.

- Senators are prohibited from receiving or giving any compensation for any Senate business, punishable by a fine of between CA$1,000 and CA$4,000.
- Any Senator can be temporarily become the Deputy Speaker.
- Administrative activities of the Senate are supervised by the Standing Senate Committee on Internal Economy, Budgets and Administration. This Committee sets the regulations for senators and the Senate as a whole. The committee also determines the suitability of any spending, goods and offices incurred by Senators.
- The Senate Ethics Officer evaluates the conduct of the Senate, has their own office and staff and reports annually on their activities. The Senate Ethics Officer and staff are immune from criminal or civil proceedings.

=== Part III - House of Commons ===
- A - Eligibility, Resignation and Vacancies
- B - Conflict of Interest
- C - Speaker, Parliamentary Secretaries, Clerk and Other Personnel

- C.1 - Caucuses

- D - Board of Internal Economy

=== Part IV and V ===
- Part IV - Remuneration of Members of Parliament
- Part V - General

- - Library of Parliament
- - Parliamentary Budget Officer
- - Parliamentary Protective Service
- - Offence and Punishment
- - Conflict of Interest and Ethics Commissioner

=== Schedule ===
This section contains the oaths to be used when examining witnesses under oath.

Source: Parliament of Canada Act R.S.C., 1985
