= Commissioner of Lobbying of Canada =

Canadian government accountability agency

Commissioner of Lobbying
- Commissaire au Lobbying
- Incumbent; Nancy Bélanger since December 30th, 2017
- Abbreviation: OCL
- Reports to: Parliament of Canada
- Nominator: Prime Minister of Canada
- Appointer: Governor in council
- Term length: 7 years renewable once
- Constituting instrument: Lobbying Act
- First holder: Karen E. Shepherd
- Salary: $183,600 (GCQ-6)

Office of the Commissioner of Lobbying of Canada
- Le Commissariat au lobbying

Agency overview
- Formed: 2006
- Headquarters: Ottawa, Ontario, Canada
- Employees: 25
- Annual budget: $5.3 million (2019)
- Website: https://www.lobbycanada.gc.ca/

The Office of the Commissioner of Lobbying of Canada is an officer of Parliament of Canada who is responsible for achieving the objectives of the Lobbying Act that came into force in 2008. The office replaced the Office of the Registrar of Lobbyists.

The Lobbying Act mandates this office and its commissioner, who holds office for seven years. Its mission has three main objectives: maintaining the registry of lobbyists; developing and implementing educational programs to create public awareness of the requirements of the Lobbying Act; conducting reviews and investigations to ensure compliance with the act and the lobbyists' code of conduct.

== Commissioners of lobbying ==
In November 2017, Prime Minister Justin Trudeau nominated Nancy Bélanger, the deputy commissioner of legal services and public affairs, as the commissioner replacing Shepherd. Her nomination was approved in December 2017.

- Karen E. Shepherd, 2009–December 2017
- Nancy Bélanger, December 2017–present
