= Clinical Risk =

- Discipline: Clinical practice
- Language: English
- Edited by: Hilary Merrett

Publication details
- History: 1995-present
- Publisher: SAGE Publications
- Frequency: Bimonthly

Standard abbreviations
- ISO 4: Clin. Risk

Indexing
- ISSN: 1356-2622 (print); 1758-1028 (web)
- OCLC no.: 48008875

Links
- Journal homepage; Online access; Online archive

Clinical Risk is a bimonthly peer-reviewed medical journal covering the field of clinical practice. The editor-in-chief is Hilary Merrett (University of Brighton). It was established in 1995 and is published by SAGE Publications.

== Abstracting and indexing ==
The journal is abstracted and indexed in:

- CINAHL
- EBSCO databases
- ProQuest databases
- Scopus
