= Public Servants Disclosure Protection Act =

Canadian Act of Parliament

Parliament of Canada
- Long title: An Act to establish a procedure for the disclosure of wrongdoings in the public sector, including the protection of persons who disclose the wrongdoings
- Considered by: House of Commons of Canada
- Considered by: Senate of Canada
- Assented to: November 25, 2005

Legislative history

First chamber: House of Commons of Canada
- Bill citation: Bill C-11
- Introduced by: Reg Alcock MP, President of the Treasury Board
- First reading: October 8, 2004
- Second reading: October 4, 2004
- Third reading: October 4, 2004

Second chamber: Senate of Canada
- Member(s) in charge: David Smith
- First reading: October 18, 2005
- Second reading: October 27, 2005
- Third reading: November 25, 2005
- Status: Current legislation

The Public Servants Disclosure Protection Act (French: Loi sur la protection des fonctionnaires divulgateurs d’actes répréhensibles) came into force in Canada on April 15, 2007. The Act creates two distinct processes: a disclosure process and a reprisal complaints process. It also creates two new bodies: the Office of the Public Sector Integrity Commissioner (PSIC) and the Public Servants Disclosure Protection Tribunal.

== Definitions ==
The Act defines wrongdoing as a contravention of any Act of Parliament or of the legislature of a province, or of any regulations made under any such Act; a misuse of public funds or a public asset; gross mismanagement in the public sector; an act or omission that creates a substantial and specific danger to the life, health or safety of persons, or to the environment, other than a danger that is inherent in the performance of the duties or functions of a public servant; a serious breach of a code of conduct established under the Act; and knowingly directing or counseling a person to commit a wrongdoing.

Under the Act, reprisal means any measures taken against a public servant because he or she has made a protected disclosure or has, in good faith, cooperated in an investigation into a disclosure. It can include any measures that could adversely affect the employment or working conditions of the person, or a threat to take any of these measures or to direct a person to do so.

Key highlights of the Act are as follows:

- The Treasury Board must establish a code of conduct applicable to the public sector. As well, every Chief Executive must establish a code of conduct applicable to the portion of the public sector for which he or she is responsible.
- Any public servant or member of the public can disclose in confidence information about suspected wrongdoing in the public sector.
- Public servants who make a good faith disclosure and those who cooperate in investigations are protected against reprisals.
- The identity of the person who made the disclosure and of the witnesses and the persons against whom disclosures are made must be protected to the extent possible.
- The right to procedural fairness and natural justice of all persons involved in a disclosure process and a reprisal complaint must be respected, including those against whom an allegation or complaint is made.
- PSIC has broad investigative powers under Part 11 of the Inquiries Act.
- The purpose of investigations under the Act is to bring the existence of wrongdoings to the attention of Chief Executives and to make recommendations concerning corrective measures.
- PSIC has exclusive jurisdiction to investigate reprisal complaints from public servants.
- Investigations into disclosures of wrongdoing and reprisal complaints are to be conducted as informally and expeditiously as possible.
- PSIC may apply to the Public Servants Disclosure Protection Tribunal, which can determine whether reprisals have been taken place and impose corrective measures and disciplinary actions.

The Act applies to all employees in the federal public sector. It excludes the Canadian Security Intelligence Service (CSIS), the Communications Security Establishment (CSE), and the Canadian Forces. However, these organizations must create comparable disclosure protection regimes.

== Criticism ==
The primary source of independent information about whistleblower legislation in Canada is the Federal Accountability Initiative for Reform (FAIR) a registered charity that provides support for whistleblowers. In early 2007, FAIR published an analysis of the Act before it came into force, listing the concerns that FAIR had expressed in its testimony to Parliament during passage of the Act. In February 2011, FAIR published an updated analysis, benefiting from its observations during four years of implementation. This document lists more than two dozen significant shortcomings under the following eight headings:

1) The scope of the law is very narrow

- For members of the Armed Forces, CSIS or the RCMP, the protection from reprisals is either limited or non-existent
- Government misconduct involving the private sector cannot be investigated properly
- The law does not address private sector misconduct at all

2) The range of avenues (for seeking investigation and redress) has been restricted rather than expanded

- All means of access to our normal courts are blocked
- There is little protection against bullying and harassment – for any employee
- Going public or disclosing to the media is strictly prohibited in most circumstances

3) The coverage of wrongdoing excludes most real-life situations

- Restrictive definition of wrongdoing
- Jurisdictional reasons for refusal to deal with disclosures
- Other vague and subjective reasons for refusal to deal with disclosures

4) The provisions for investigations and corrective action are weak

- The Commissioner is restricted to a reactive, fragmented approach
- There is no reliable mechanism to correct wrongdoing or discipline wrongdoers

5) Most complaints of reprisal are likely to be rejected

- Jurisdictional reasons to reject a complaint of reprisal
- Short time limit to file a complaint
- Definitional reasons for rejection of a complaint
- The Commissioner need not refer any case to the tribunal
- Non-government whistleblowers effectively have no protection

6) The tribunal is unlikely to protect anyone

- Near-impossible burden of proof
- Lack of legal assistance
- No access to courts
- Inadequate penalties and remedies

7) The entire process is shrouded in impenetrable secrecy

- Access to Information
- Misclassification of documents
- Secret hearings
- Decisions need not be filed with federal Court
- Gag orders

8) The legal strategy is perverse and ill-conceived

- The law is unwieldy, complex, and costly

== Implementation red flags ==
The agency created to administer the Act – the Office of the Public Sector Integrity Commissioner (OPSIC) – has had a troubled history. During its first three years of operation it found no cases of wrongdoing in the federal public service, and no cases of reprisal against any whistleblower. Out of more than two hundred cases received only a handful were investigated, and none of these investigations found anything amiss. Critics claimed that it is implausible that there is no wrongdoing to be found: the agency is mandated to protect about 400,000 public servants working within a system that disposes of more than half a billion dollars each day. In addition some individuals who were turned away by OPSIC (such as veteran Sean Bruyea) have since been vindicated by other means.

== Resignation of Integrity Commissioner ==
In October 2010 the head of OPSIC, Public Sector Integrity Commissioner Christiane Ouimet, unexpectedly resigned less than halfway through her seven-year term, following media reports that she was under investigation by Canada's Auditor General. The Auditor General's report, published in December 2010, was highly critical of Ouimet and concluded that the commissioner had failed to do her job, had been an abusive manager, and had taken reprisals against former staff members. For more than two months Ouimet refused to attend a parliamentary committee that summoned her to appear and explain her actions. When she finally did appear she claimed that she had been victimized by the Auditor General's intensive investigation, that she had done nothing wrong, and that the Auditor General's findings were incorrect. There was further controversy about Ouimet's departure when it became known that the government had paid her more than $500,000 'severance' to resign, with a gag order that prohibits her from criticizing the government (or vice versa). Critics claimed that she had been rewarded for incompetence and misconduct, and paid to keep quiet.

== More recent review and analysis of the Act ==
In 2017 the Standing Committee on Government Operations and Estimates (known as OGGO) was asked by the government to conduct a review of the Act. This was the independent review required by law, which should have taken place 5 years after the Act came into force, but would now take place 10 years after. The Committee carried out a thorough, in-depth review, conducting 12 meetings, hearing from 52 witnesses and receiving 12 written briefs. The final report, which was unanimous, called for sweeping changes to the Act, in the form of 15 detailed recommendations. As of March 2021, none of these has been implemented.

In June 2017 the Centre for Free Expression (which has largely taken over the work previously carried out by FAIR) published an updated analysis of the Act, looking both at what's written in the legislation, and how it has worked in practice. Its conclusions include the following: a) the system has been completely ineffective in protecting whistleblowers b) the system has been largely ineffective in exposing government misconduct c) the system is not trusted by public servants d) the system is considered deeply flawed by international experts e) measurement and monitoring of performance has been inadequate f) Parliamentary oversight has been essentially non-existent g) the actions of successive Integrity Commissioners have undermined the system and h) the actions of successive governments have blocked examination and review of the system.

In March 2021, the Government Accountability Project (GAP) and the International Bar Association (IBA) published a joint report, the result of a study of national whistleblower laws in 37 countries. Each jurisdiction was awarded a number of points out of 20, based on GAP's 20 International Best Practices for Whistleblower Policies. The highest scores achieved were 16 out of 20, awarded to the European Union, Australia, and the USA. Canada was awarded the lowest score (1 out of 20), alongside Lebanon and Norway.
