= Parliament of Canada =

Federal bicameral legislature of Canada

Coordinates: 45.42521°N 75.70011°W

Parliament of Canada Parlement du Canada
- 45th Parliament

Type
- Type: Bicameral
- Houses: Senate; House of Commons

History
- Founded: July 1, 1867
- Preceded by: Initially assumed some jurisdiction from: Parliament of the Province of Canada; General Assembly of Nova Scotia; New Brunswick Legislature; Later added some jurisdiction from: Hudson's Bay Company; Legislative Council of British Columbia; General Assembly of Prince Edward Island; General Assembly of Newfoundland (then suspended); Parliament of the United Kingdom

Leadership
- Monarch: Charles III since 8 September 2022
- Governor General: Louise Arbour since 8 June 2026
- Speaker of the Senate: Raymonde Gagné, Non-affiliated since 12 May 2023
- Speaker of the House of Commons: Francis Scarpaleggia, Liberal since 26 May 2025
- Prime Minister: Mark Carney, Liberal since 14 March 2025
- Leader of the Official Opposition: Pierre Poilievre, Conservative since 18 August 2025

Structure
- Seats: 448; 105 senators; 343 members of Parliament
- Senate political groups: His Majesty's Government; Government Representative’s Office (5); His Majesty’s Loyal Opposition; Conservative Party (12); Other groups; Independent Senators Group (38); Progressive Senate Group (17); Canadian Senators Group (16); Non-affiliated (5); Vacancies; Vacant (9)
- House of Commons political groups: His Majesty's Government: Liberal (173); His Majesty’s Loyal Opposition: Conservative (138); Parties with official status: Bloc Québécois (21); Parties without official status: New Democratic (5); Green (1); Vacant (5)

Elections
- Senate voting system: Appointment by the governor general on advice of the prime minister
- House of Commons voting system: First-past-the-post
- First House of Commons election: August 7 – September 20, 1867
- Last House of Commons election: April 28, 2025
- Next House of Commons election: On or before October 15, 2029

Meeting place
- Centre Block – Parliament Hill, Ottawa, Ontario (both houses, permanent); Senate of Canada Building, 2 Rideau Street, Ottawa, Ontario (Senate only – temporary during renovations); West Block – Parliament Hill, Ottawa, Ontario (House of Commons only – temporary during renovations)

Website
- parl.ca

The Parliament of Canada (French: Parlement du Canada) is the federal legislature of Canada. The Crown, along with two chambers (the Senate and the House of Commons), form the bicameral legislature.

The 343 members of the lower house, the House of Commons, are styled as members of Parliament (MPs), and each elected to represent an electoral district (also known as a riding). The 105 members of the upper house, the Senate, are styled senators and appointed by the governor general on the advice of the prime minister. Collectively, MPs and senators are known as parliamentarians.

Bills may originate in either the House of Commons or the Senate, however, bills involving raising or spending funds must originate in the House of Commons. By constitutional convention, and following the Westminster system of government, the House of Commons is dominant, with the Senate rarely opposing its will. The Crown provides royal assent to make bills into law. The federal fiscal year runs from April 1 to March 31.

The governor general, on the advice of the prime minister, summons and calls together the House of Commons, and may prorogue or dissolve Parliament, in order to either end a parliamentary session or call a general election. The governor general also delivers the throne speech at the opening of each new Parliament (the monarch occasionally has done so instead of the governor general).

The incumbent 45th Canadian Parliament is a Liberal majority government.

== Composition ==
The body consists of the King of Canada, represented by a viceroy, the governor general; an upper house, the Senate; and a lower house, the House of Commons. Each element has its own officers and organization. Each has a distinct role, but work in conjunction within the legislative process. This format was inherited from the United Kingdom and is a near-identical copy of the Parliament at Westminster, the greatest differences stemming from situations unique to Canada, such as the impermanent nature of the monarch's residency in the country and the lack of a peerage to form the upper chamber.

Only those who sit in the House of Commons are usually called members of Parliament (MPs); the term is not usually applied to senators (except in legislation, such as the Parliament of Canada Act), even though the Senate is a part of Parliament. Though legislatively less powerful, senators take higher positions in the national order of precedence. No individual may serve in more than one chamber at the same time.

=== Monarch ===
The sovereign's place in the legislature, formally known as the King-in-Parliament, is defined by the Constitution Act, 1867, and various conventions. Neither he nor his viceroy, however, participates in the legislative process save for signifying the King's approval to a bill passed by both houses of Parliament, known as royal assent, which is necessary for a bill to be enacted as law. All federal bills thus begin with the phrase "Now, therefore, His Majesty, by and with the advice and consent of the Senate and House of Commons of Canada, enacts as follows ..." and, as such, the Crown is immune from acts of Parliament unless expressed otherwise in the act itself. The governor general normally grants royal assent, though the monarch may also do so, at the request of either the Cabinet or the viceroy, who may defer assent to the sovereign as per the constitution.

As both the monarch and his or her representatives are traditionally barred from the House of Commons (because Charles I tried to personally arrest five members in the English Commons chamber in 1642), any parliamentary ceremonies in which they are involved take place in the Senate chamber. The upper and lower houses do, however, each contain a mace, which indicates the authority of the King-in-Parliament and the privilege granted to that body by him, both bearing a crown at their apex. The original mace for the Senate was that used in the Legislative Council of the Province of Canada after 1849, while that of the House of Commons was inherited from the Legislative Assembly of the Province of Canada, first used in 1845. Following the burning of the Centre Block on 3 February 1916, the City of London, England, donated a replacement, which is still used today. The temporary mace, made of wood, and used until the new one arrived from the United Kingdom in 1917, is still carried into the Senate each 3 February. The Senate's 1.6-metre-long mace comprises brass and gold. The Senate may not sit if its mace is not in the chamber; it typically sits on the table with the crown facing the throne, though it may, during certain ceremonies, be held by the mace bearer, standing adjacent to the governor general or monarch in the Senate.

Members of the two houses of Parliament must also express their loyalty to the sovereign and defer to his authority, as the Oath of Allegiance must be sworn by all new parliamentarians before they may take their seats. Further, the official opposition is formally called His Majesty's Loyal Opposition, to signify that, though they may be opposed to the incumbent Cabinet's policies, they remain dedicated to the apolitical Crown.

=== Senate ===
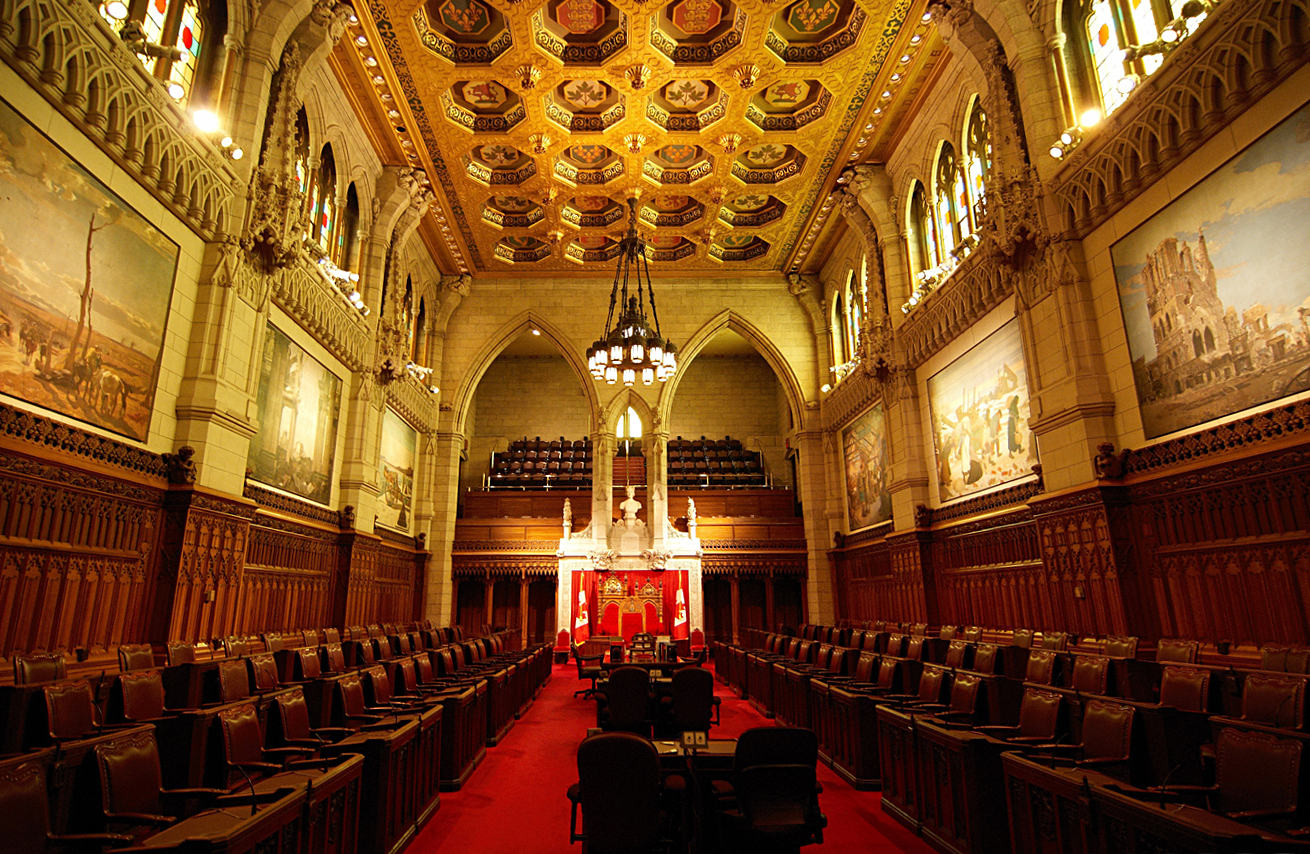
The Senate

The upper house of the Parliament of Canada, the Senate (French: Sénat), is a group of 105 individuals appointed by the governor general on the advice of the prime minister; all those appointed must, per the constitution, be a minimum of 30 years old, be a subject of the monarch, and own property with a net worth of at least $4,000, in addition to owning land worth no less than $4,000 within the province the candidate seeks to represent. Senators served for life until 1965, when a constitutional amendment imposed a mandatory retirement age of 75. Senators may, however, resign their seats prior to that mark, and can lose their position should they fail to attend two consecutive sessions of Parliament.

The principle underlying the Senate's composition is equality amongst Canada's geographic regions (called Divisions in the Constitution): 24 for Ontario, 24 for Quebec, 24 for the Maritimes (10 for Nova Scotia, 10 for New Brunswick, and four for Prince Edward Island), and 24 for the Western provinces (six each for Manitoba, British Columbia, Saskatchewan, and Alberta). Additionally, senators are appointed from two geographic areas not part of any senatorial division. Newfoundland and Labrador (since 1949 the "newest" province, although "oldest" English settlement), is represented by six senators. Since 1975 each of Canada's territories is represented by 1 senator—the Northwest Territories, Yukon, and (since its formation in 1999) Nunavut. An additional 4 or 8 senators may be appointed by the governor general, provided the approval of the King is secured and the four divisions are equally represented. This power has been employed once since 1867: to ensure the passage of the bill establishing the Goods and Services Tax, Prime Minister Brian Mulroney advised Queen Elizabeth II to appoint extra senators in 1990. This results in a temporary maximum number of senators of 113, which must through attrition return to its normal number of 105.

=== House of Commons ===
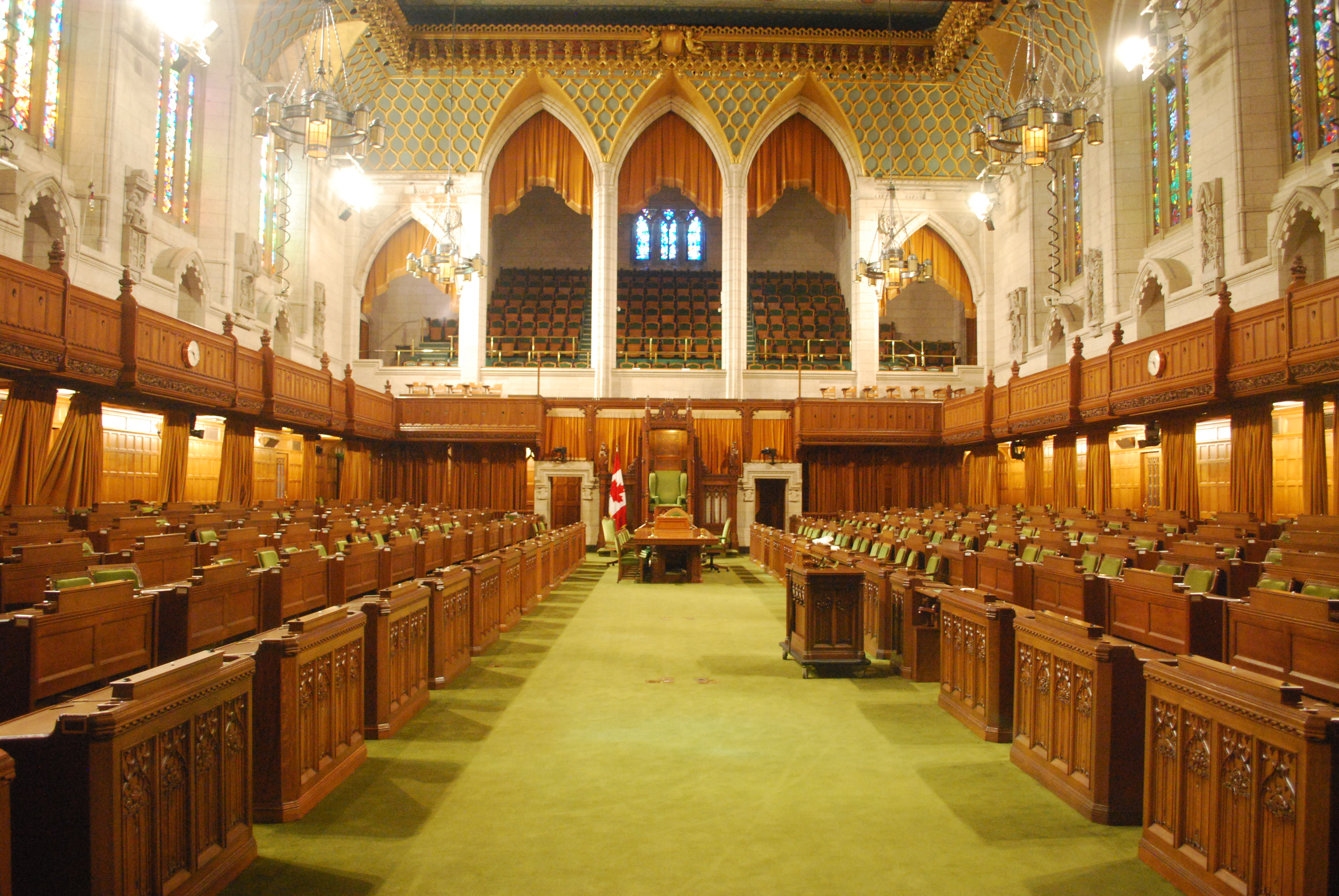
The House of Commons

The elected component of the Canadian Parliament is the House of Commons (French: Chambre des communes), with each member chosen by a plurality of voters in each of the country's federal electoral districts. To run for one of the 343 seats in the House of Commons, an individual must be a Canadian citizen and at least 18 years old. Each member holds office until Parliament is dissolved, after which they may seek re-election. The districts are regularly reorganized according to the results of each decennial national census, primarily on the basis that each province is entitled to one MP for every unit of population (called the "electoral quotient") it has, or part thereof. However, other clauses in the Constitution Act, 1867 guarantee provinces additional MPs, resulting in a deviation from absolute representation by population.

== Jurisdiction ==
The powers of the Parliament of Canada are limited by the constitution, which divides legislative abilities between the federal and provincial legislatures; in general, provincial legislatures may only pass laws relating to topics explicitly reserved for them by the constitution (such as education, provincial officers, municipal government, charitable institutions, and "matters of a merely local or private nature") while any matter not under the exclusive authority of the provincial legislatures is within the scope of the federal Parliament's power. Thus, Parliament alone can pass laws relating to, among other things, the postal service, census, military, navigation and shipping, fishing, currency, banking, weights and measures, bankruptcy, copyrights, patents, First Nations, and naturalization. In some cases, however, the jurisdictions of the federal and provincial parliaments may be more vague. For instance, the federal parliament regulates marriage and divorce in general, but the solemnization of marriage is regulated only by the provincial legislatures. Other examples include the powers of both the federal and provincial parliaments to impose taxes, borrow money, punish crimes, and regulate agriculture.

The powers of Parliament are also limited by the Canadian Charter of Rights and Freedoms, though most of its provisions can be overridden by use of the notwithstanding clause. Such clause, however, has never been used by the federal parliament, though it has been employed by some provincial legislatures. Laws violating any part of the constitution are invalid and may be ruled unconstitutional by the courts.

== Officers ==
Each of Parliament's two chambers is presided over by a speaker; that for the Senate is a member appointed by the governor general on the advice of the prime minister, while the equivalent for the House of Commons is a member of Parliament, who is elected by the other members of that body. In general, the powers of the latter are greater than those of the former. Following the British model, the upper chamber is essentially self-regulating, but the lower chamber is controlled by the chair, in a majoritarian model that gives great power and authority to the chair. In 1991, however, the powers of the speaker of the Senate were expanded, which reorganized the balance of power to be closer to the framework of the Commons.

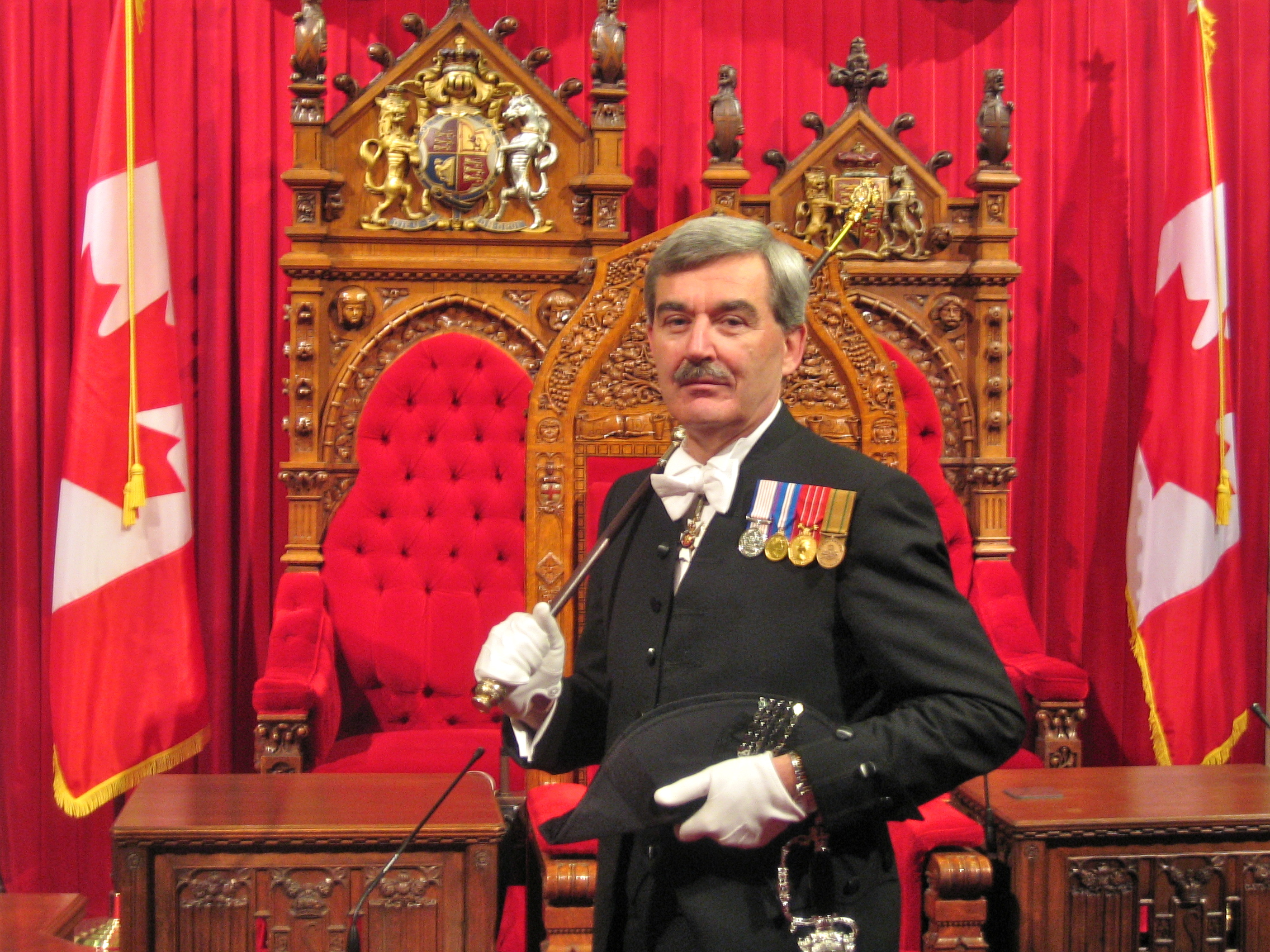
Usher of the black rod, Kevin S. MacLeod, before the thrones in the Senate chamber, 2009

The usher of the black rod of the Senate of Canada is the most senior protocol position in Parliament, being the personal messenger to the legislature of the sovereign and governor general. The usher is also a floor officer of the Senate responsible for security in that chamber, as well as for protocol, administrative, and logistical details of important events taking place on Parliament Hill, such as the Speech from the Throne, Royal Assent ceremonies, state funerals, or the investiture of a new governor general.

Other officers of Parliament include the auditor general, chief electoral officer, official languages commissioner, privacy commissioner, information commissioner, conflict of interest and ethics commissioner, public sector integrity commissioner, and commissioner of lobbying. These individuals are appointed by either one or both houses, to which they report through the speaker of that house. They are sometimes referred to as Agents of Parliament. Another key official is the parliamentary librarian, a position established in 1871 under the Library of Parliament Act, charged with directing the Library of Parliament.

== Term ==
The Constitution Act, 1867, outlines that the governor general alone is responsible for summoning Parliament, though it remains the monarch's prerogative to prorogue and dissolve the legislature, after which the writs for a general federal election are usually dropped by the governor general at Rideau Hall. Upon completion of the election, the governor general, on the advice of the prime minister, then issues a royal proclamation summoning Parliament to assemble. On the date given, new MPs are sworn in and then are, along with returning MPs, called to the Senate, where they are instructed to elect their speaker and return to the House of Commons to do so before adjourning.

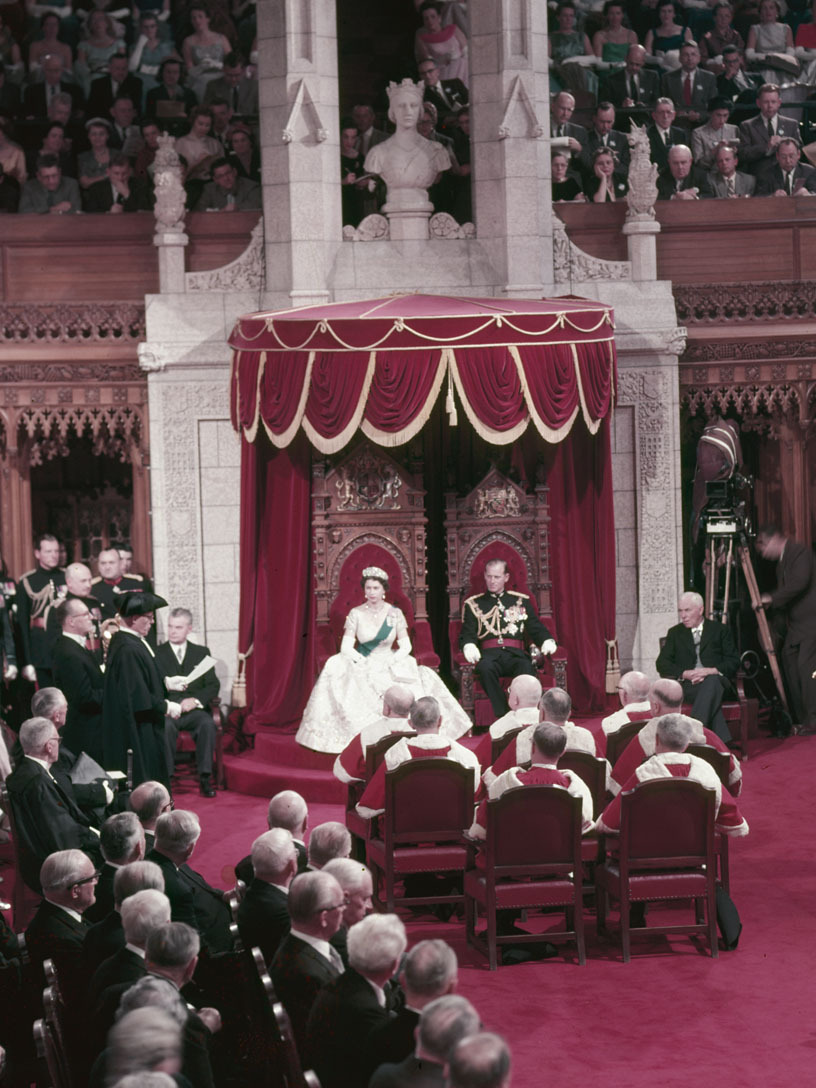
Queen Elizabeth II and Prince Philip at the opening of Parliament, 14 October 1957

The new parliamentary session is marked by the opening of Parliament, a ceremony where a range of topics can be addressed in a Speech From the Throne given by the monarch, the governor general, or a royal delegate. (Note: On 1 September 1919, Edward, Prince of Wales (later King Edward VIII) read the Speech From the Throne at the opening of the third session of the 13th Canadian Parliament.) The usher of the black rod invites MPs to these events, knocking on the doors of the lower house that have been slammed shut—a symbolic arrangement designed to illustrate the Commons' right to deny entry to anyone, including even the monarch (but with an exception for royal messengers). Once the MPs are gathered behind the Bar of the Senate—save for the prime minister, the only MP permitted into the Senate proper to sit near the throne dais—the House of Commons speaker presents to the monarch or governor general, and formally claims the rights and privileges of the House of Commons; and then the speaker of the Senate, on behalf of the Crown, replies in acknowledgement after the sovereign or viceroy takes their seat on the throne. The speech is then read aloud. It can outline the program of the Cabinet for the upcoming legislative session, as well as other matters chosen by the speaker.

A parliamentary session lasts until a prorogation, after which, without ceremony, both chambers of the legislature cease all legislative business until the governor general issues another proclamation calling for a new session to begin; except for the election of a speaker for the House of Commons and his or her claiming of that house's privileges, the same procedures for the opening of Parliament are again followed. After a number of such sessions—having ranged from one to seven—a Parliament comes to an end via dissolution, and a general election typically follows. Subject to the governor general's discretion, general elections are held four years after the previous on the third Monday in October or, on the recommendation of the chief electoral officer, the following Tuesday or Monday. The governor general may dissolve Parliament and call a general election outside of these fixed dates, conventionally on the advice of the prime minister, which may be preceded by a successful motion of no confidence. The timing of such dissolutions may be politically motivated.

== Procedure ==
Both houses determine motions by voice vote; the presiding officer puts the question and, after listening to shouts of "yea" and "nay" from the members, announces which side is victorious. This decision by the Speaker is final, unless a recorded vote is demanded by members—requiring at least two in the Senate and five in the House of Commons. Members of both houses vote by rising in their places to be counted; the speaker of the Senate is permitted to vote on a motion or bill—though does so irregularly, in the interest of impartiality—and, if there is no majority, the motion is defeated. In the Commons, however, the speaker cannot vote, unless to break a tie. The speaker customarily votes in favour of the status quo. The constitution establishes the quorums to be 15 senators in the upper house and 20 members in the lower house, the speaker of each body being counted within the tally.

Voting can thus take three possible forms: whenever possible, leaving the matter open for future consideration and allowing for further discussion by the house; when no further discussion is possible, taking into account that the matter could somehow be brought back in future and be decided by a majority in the house; or, leaving a bill in its existing form rather than having it amended. For example, during the vote on the 2005 budget, which was considered a vote of confidence, the speaker of the House of Commons cast the tie-breaking vote during the second reading, moving in favour of the budget and allowing its passage. If the vote on the third reading had again been tied, the speaker would have been expected to vote against the bill, bringing down the government.

Simultaneous interpretation for both official languages, English and French, is provided at all times during sessions of both houses.

== Legislative functions ==
Laws, known in their draft form as bills, may be introduced by any member of either house. However, most bills originate in the House of Commons, of which most are put forward by ministers of the Crown, making them government bills, as opposed to private members' bills or private senators' bills, which are launched by MPs and senators, respectively, who are not in cabinet. Draft legislation may also be categorized as public bills, if they apply to the general public, or private bills, if they concern a particular person or limited group of people. Each bill then goes through a series of stages in each chamber, beginning with the first reading. It is not, however, until the bill's second reading that the general principles of the proposed law are debated; though rejection is a possibility, such is not common for government bills.

Next, the bill is sent by the house where it is being debated to one of several committees. The Standing Orders outline the general mandate for all committees, allowing them to review: bills as they pertain to relevant departments; the program and policy plans, as well as the projected expenditures, and the effectiveness of the implementation thereof, for the same departments; and the analysis of the performance of those departments. Most often, bills end up before a standing committee, which is a body of members or senators who specialize in a particular subject (such as foreign affairs), and who may hear testimony from ministers and experts, debate the bill, and recommend amendments. The bill may also be committed to the Committee of the Whole, a body consisting of, as the name suggests, all the members of the chamber in question. Finally, the bill could be referred to an ad hoc committee established solely to review the piece of legislation in question. Each chamber has their own procedure for dealing with this, with the Senate establishing special committees that function like most other committees, and the House of Commons establishing legislative committees, the chair of the latter being appointed by the speaker of the House of Commons, and is normally one of his deputies. Whichever committee is used, any amendments proposed by the committee are considered by the whole house in the report stage. Furthermore, additional amendments not proposed by the committee may also be made.

After the report stage (or, if the committee made no amendments to the bill, immediately after the committee stage), the final phase of the bill—the third reading—occurs, at which time further amendments are not permitted in the House of Commons, but are allowed in the Senate. If it passes the third reading, the bill is sent to the other house of Parliament, where it passes through the same stages; (Note: Although rare, at times the incorrect version of a bill is transmitted between houses (i.e. not what passed third reading)—causing procedural problems, especially if not caught quickly, allowing the other house to advance the incorrect bill through multiple stages. For the last two occurrences (2014 and 2001), see Jordan Press (28 August 2014). "House of Commons to Correct Errors in Crime Bill it Sent to Senate". Ottawa Citizen. National News..) amendments made by the second chamber require the assent of the original house in order to stand part of the final bill. If one house passes amendments that the other will not agree to, and the two houses cannot resolve their disagreements, the bill fails.

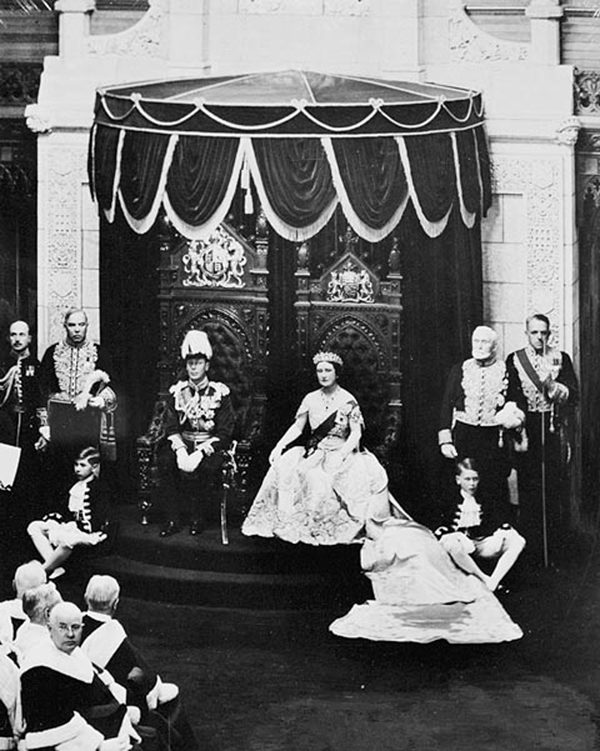
King George VI, with Queen Elizabeth, grants Royal Assent to bills in the Senate chamber, 1939

Once the bill is passed in identical form by both houses, it is presented for Royal Assent; in theory, the governor general has three options: grant Royal Assent, thereby making the bill into law; withhold Royal Assent, thereby vetoing the bill; or reserve the bill for the signification of the King's pleasure, which allows the sovereign to personally grant or withhold assent. If the governor general does grant Royal Assent, the monarch may, within two years, disallow the bill, thus annulling the law in question. In the federal sphere, no bill has ever been denied royal approval.

In conformity with the British model, only the House of Commons may originate bills for the imposition of taxes or for the appropriation of Crown funds. The constitutional amendment procedure does make provision for the Commons overcoming an otherwise-required Senate resolution in most cases. Otherwise, the theoretical power of both houses over bills is equal, with the assent of each being required for passage. In practice, however, the House of Commons is dominant, with the Senate rarely exercising its powers in a way that opposes the will of the democratically elected house.

== Relationship with the executive ==
The federal government consists of the monarch (represented by the governor general)-in-council, which is a collection of ministers of the Crown appointed by the governor general to direct the use of executive powers. Per the tenets of responsible government, these individuals are almost always drawn from Parliament, and are predominantly from the House of Commons, the only body to which ministers are held accountable, typically during Question Period, wherein ministers are obliged to answer questions posed by members of the opposition. Hence, the person who can command the confidence of the lower chamber—usually the leader of the party with the most seats therein—is typically appointed as prime minister. Should that person not hold a seat in the House of Commons, the prime minister will, by convention, seek election to one at the earliest possible opportunity; frequently, in such situations, a junior member of Parliament who holds a safe seat will resign to allow the prime minister to run for that riding in a by-election. If no party holds a majority, it is customary for the governor general to summon a minority government or coalition government, depending on which the commons will support.

The lower house may attempt to bring down the government by either rejecting a motion of confidence—generally initiated by a minister to reinforce the Cabinet's support in the commons—or by passing a motion of no confidence—introduced by the opposition to display its distrust of the Cabinet. Important bills that form part of the government's agenda will usually be considered matters of confidence; the budget is always a matter of confidence. Where a government has lost the confidence of the House of Commons, the prime minister is obliged to either resign (allowing the governor general to appoint the leader of the Opposition to the office) or seek the dissolution of Parliament and the call of a general election. A precedent, however, was set in 1968, when the government of Lester B. Pearson unexpectedly lost a confidence vote but was allowed to remain in power with the mutual consent of the leaders of the other parties.

In practice, the House of Commons' scrutiny of the government is quite weak in comparison to the equivalent chamber in other countries using the Westminster system. With the plurality voting system used in parliamentary elections tending to provide the governing party with a large majority, and a party system that gives leaders strict control over their caucus (to the point that MPs may be expelled from their parties for voting against the instructions of party leaders), there is often limited need to compromise with other parties. Additionally, Canada has fewer MPs, a higher turnover rate of MPs after each election, and an Americanized system for selecting political party leaders, leaving them accountable to the party membership rather than caucus, as is the case in the United Kingdom; John Robson of the National Post opined that Canada's parliament had become a body akin to the American Electoral College, "its sole and ceremonial role to confirm the executive in power."

At the end of the 20th century and into the 21st, analysts—such as Jeffrey Simpson, Donald Savoie, and John Gomery—argued that both Parliament and the Cabinet had become eclipsed by prime ministerial power. Thus, defeats of majority governments on issues of confidence are very rare. In contrast, a minority government is more volatile, and is more likely to fall due to loss of confidence. The last prime ministers to lose confidence votes were Stephen Harper in 2011, Paul Martin in 2005 and Joe Clark in 1979, all involving minority governments. The passage of the Reform Act and resulting changes to the Parliament of Canada Act, in 2015, were a response to this trend and an attempt to increase the power and independence of MPs.

== Privileges ==
Parliament possesses a number of privileges, collectively and accordingly known as parliamentary privilege, each house being the guardian and administrator of its own set of rights. Parliament itself determines the extent of parliamentary privilege, each house overseeing its own affairs, but the constitution bars it from conferring any "exceeding those at the passing of such an Act held, enjoyed, and exercised by the [British House of] Commons... and by the Members thereof."

The foremost dispensation held by both houses of Parliament is that of freedom of speech in debate; nothing said within the chambers may be questioned by any court or other institution outside of Parliament. In particular, a member of either house cannot be sued for slander based on words uttered in the course of parliamentary proceedings, the only restraint on debate being set by the standing orders of each house. Further, MPs and senators are immune to arrest in civil (but not criminal) cases, from jury service and attendance in courts as witnesses. They may, however, be disciplined by their colleagues for breach of the rules, including contempt of Parliament—disobedience of its authority; for example, giving false testimony before a parliamentary committee—and breaches of its own privileges.

The Canadian Heraldic Authority, on 15 April 2008, confirmed the right of the Parliament of Canada to use a heraldic badge composed of symbols of the three elements of Parliament: the escutcheon of the Royal Arms of Canada with the maces of the House of Commons and Senate crossed behind.

The budget for the Parliament of Canada for the 2010 fiscal year was $583,567,000.

== History ==
Following the cession of New France to the United Kingdom in the 1763 Treaty of Paris, Canada was governed according to the Royal Proclamation issued by King George III in that same year. To this was added the Quebec Act, by which the power to make ordinances was granted to a governor-in-council, both the governor and council being appointed by the British monarch in Westminster, on the advice of his or her ministers there. In 1791, the Province of Quebec was divided into Upper and Lower Canada, each with an elected legislative assembly, an appointed legislative council, and a governor, mirroring the parliamentary structure in Britain.

During the War of 1812, American troops set fire to the buildings of the Legislative Assembly of Upper Canada in York (now Toronto). In 1841, the British government united the two Canadas into the Province of Canada, with a single legislature composed of, again, an assembly, council, and governor general; the 84 members of the lower chamber were equally divided among the two former provinces, though Lower Canada had a higher population. The governor still held significant personal influence over Canadian affairs until 1848, when responsible government was implemented in Canada.

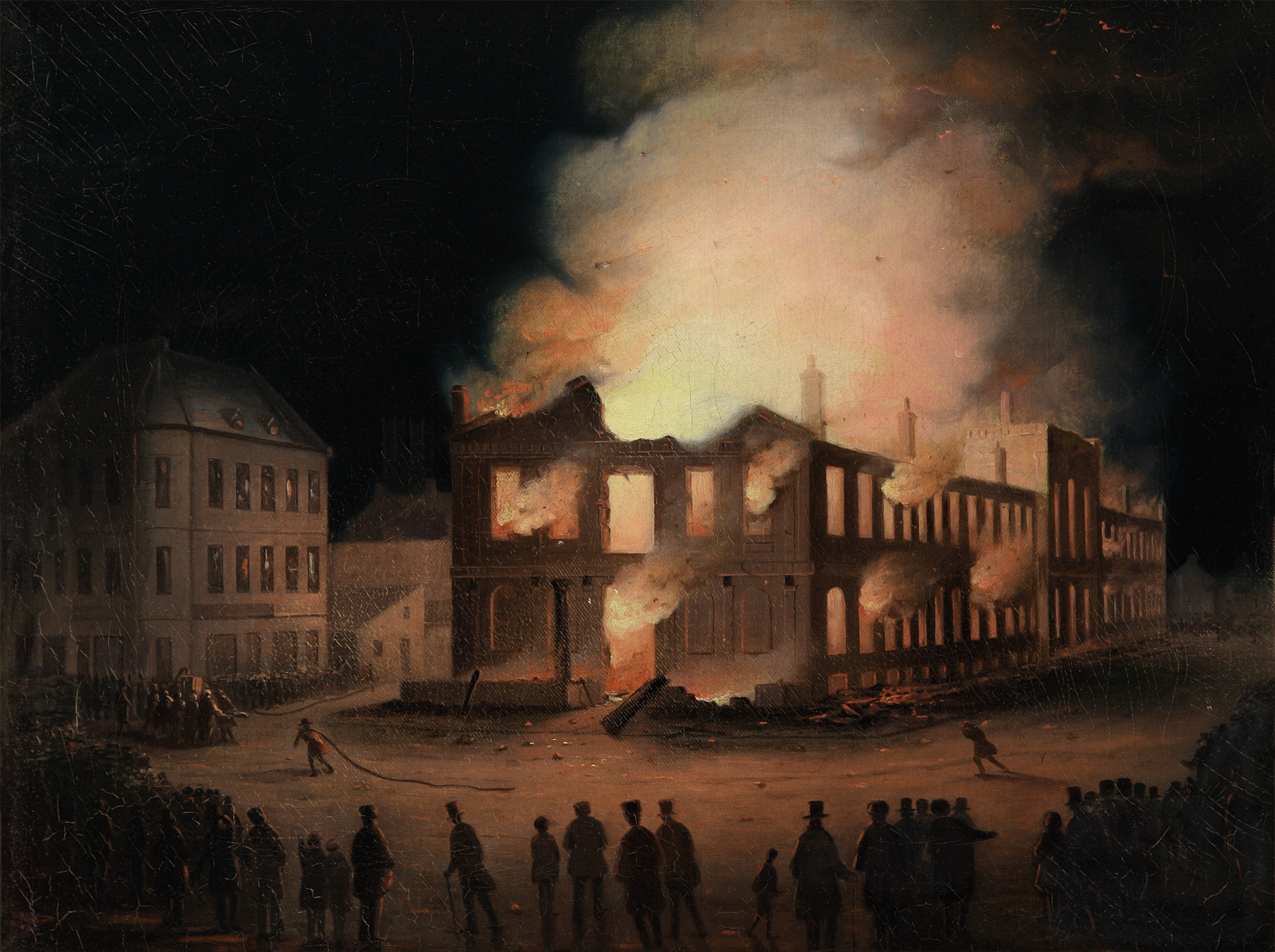
The burning of the Parliament in Montreal, 1849

The actual site of Parliament shifted on a regular basis: From 1841 to 1844, it sat in Kingston, where the present Kingston General Hospital now stands; from 1844 until the 1849 fire that destroyed the building, the legislature was in Montreal; and, after a few years of alternating between Toronto and Quebec City, the legislature was finally moved to Ottawa in 1856, Queen Victoria having chosen that city as Canada's capital in 1857.

The modern-day Parliament of Canada came into existence in 1867, in which year the Parliament of the United Kingdom of Great Britain and Ireland passed the British North America Act, 1867, uniting the provinces of New Brunswick, Nova Scotia, and Canada—with the Province of Canada split into Quebec and Ontario—into a single federation known as Canada. Though the form of the new federal legislature was again nearly identical to the Parliament of the United Kingdom, the decision to retain this model was made with heavy influence from the just-concluded American Civil War, which indicated to many Canadians the faults of the American federal system, with its relatively powerful states and a less powerful federal government. The British North America Act limited the powers of the provinces, providing that all subjects not explicitly delegated to them by that document remain within the authority of the Canadian Parliament, while simultaneously giving the provinces unique powers in certain agreed-upon areas of jurisdiction.

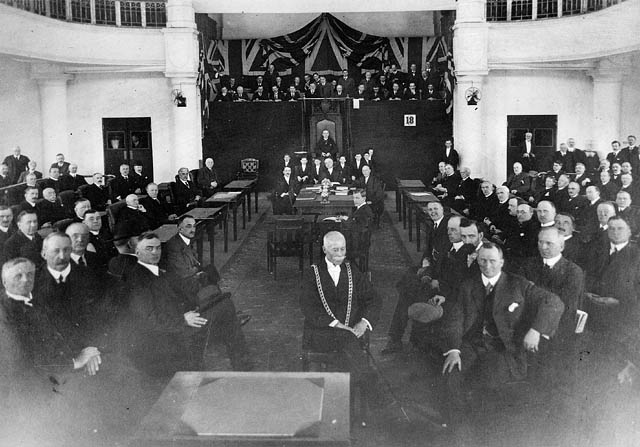
The first session of the House of Commons in its temporary location at the Victoria Memorial Museum, 18 March 1918

Full legislative autonomy was granted by the Statute of Westminster, 1931, passed by the Parliament of the United Kingdom. Though the statute allowed the Parliament of Canada to repeal or amend previously British laws as they applied to Canada, it did not permit amendment to Canada's constitution, including the British North America Acts. Hence, whenever a constitutional amendment was sought by the Canadian Parliament, the enactment of a British law was necessary, though Canada's consent was required. The Parliament of Canada was granted limited power to amend the constitution by a British Act of Parliament in 1949, but it was not permitted to affect the powers of provincial governments, the official positions of the English and French languages, rights of any class of persons with respect to schools, or the maximum five-year term of the legislature.

While her father, King George VI, had been the first Canadian monarch to grant royal assent in the legislature—doing so in 1939—Queen Elizabeth II was the first sovereign to deliver the speech from the throne. This event, in 1957, was the first time television cameras were allowed into the chambers of parliament, as the Canadian Broadcasting Corporation broadcast the speech nation-wide.

The Canadian House of Commons and Senate last requested the Parliament of the United Kingdom to enact a constitutional amendment in 1982, in the form of the Canada Act 1982 which included the Constitution Act, 1982. This legislation terminated the power of the British Parliament's ability to legislate for Canada and the authority to amend the constitution was transferred to the Canadian House of Commons, the Senate, and the provincial legislative assemblies, acting jointly. Most amendments require the consent of the Senate, the House of Commons, and the legislative assemblies of two-thirds of the provinces representing a majority of the population; the unanimous consent of provincial legislative assemblies is required for certain amendments, including those affecting the sovereign, the governor general, the provincial lieutenant governors, the official status of the English and French languages, the Supreme Court of Canada, and the amending formulas themselves.

== See also ==
- Canadian Parliament Buildings
- Hansard
- Joint address (Canada)
- List of Canadian federal parliaments
- List of legislatures by country
- Politics of Canada
- Procedural officers and senior officials of the Parliament of Canada
- Records of members of the Parliament of Canada
