= What WE Lost =

Book by Tawfiq S. Rangwala

What WE Lost: Inside the Attack on Canada's Largest Children's Charity
- Author: Tawfiq S. Rangwala
- Publisher: Optimum Press
- Publication date: May 5, 2022
- ISBN: 0-888-90320-0
- Website: whatwelost.com

What WE Lost: Inside the Attack on Canada's Largest Children's Charity is a book by Tawfiq S. Rangwala which documents the history of Canada's WE Charity scandal and its effects upon WE Charity. Rangwala, a New York City-based Canadian lawyer, sat on WE Charity's board of directors before stepping down in 2021 to write the book.

Published in 2022 by Optimum Press, the book chronicles the controversy surrounding the Justin Trudeau government's selection of WE Charity to administer the 2020 Canada Student Service Grant (CSSG) program. It was Canada's number-one bestselling non-fiction book in June 2022 and has been the subject of detailed reviews in Literary Review of Canada and Winnipeg Free Press.

== Background ==
For years prior to the outbreak of the COVID-19 pandemic, WE Charity had been one of Canada's larger charities, with the mission to promote human rights and improve living conditions in the developing world. Founded by then-teenaged brothers Craig and Marc Kielburger as Free the Children, it attracted the attention of public figures ranging from Oprah Winfrey and Bill Gates to the Dalai Lama.

WE Charity soon became known for its engagement with students and schools. Starting in 2007, large events called WE Days in Canada, the United States and the United Kingdom were attended by thousands of student volunteers and featured speakers including Kofi Annan, Ban Ki-moon, Justin Trudeau, Prince Harry, Lewis Hamilton, Idris Elba, and Gord Downie.

In 2009, Craig and Marc Kielburger created ME to WE, a social enterprise to create jobs in developing countries by bringing local artisans' work to western markets while donating its profits to WE Charity. ME to WE also provided travel services to western youths who wanted to perform volunteer work in developing countries, such as assisting with harvests, collecting water, and building schools.

== CSSG controversy ==
On April 19, 2020, a month into the COVID-19 pandemic, Employment and Social Development Canada approached WE Charity to discuss the possibility of administering a youth service program as a component of the government's response to unemployment. The Canada Student Service Grant (CSSG) program would pay young Canadians to volunteer with non-profit enterprises over the summer. WE Charity, which had already been organizing volunteer efforts in thousands of schools, would connect 100,000 volunteers with other non-profits across Canada, with just under $35 million of the program's $543.5 budget allocated to administration.

The agreement, signed on June 23, soon led to controversy due to the charity's previous engagements with Prime Minister Justin Trudeau and members of his family. Trudeau had appeared at several WE Days, and WE Charity had paid for his wife's travel to WE events. Trudeau's mother Margaret and his brother Alexandre were paid speakers at several events.

On the basis of these prior connections, the Conservative opposition alleged wrongdoing. Within a week, Canada's Ethics Commissioner initiated an investigation, and the House of Commons Standing Committee on Finance and the Standing Committee on Access to Information, Privacy and Ethics opened hearings into the matter.

During the parliamentary hearings, Morneau, both the Kielburgers, and five dozen others faced ten months of questioning from opposition MPs. The most aggressive was Conservative MP Pierre Poilievre, who objected to the notion that WE's costs for running the program would be reimbursed by the government. Another was Charlie Angus of the New Democratic Party. Literary Review of Canada's Ian Smillie commented, "While they directed their outrage at the Kielburgers, their obvious target was Justin Trudeau."

Amidst the chaos of the pandemic, there had been no tendering process, and Trudeau had not formally recused himself from his cabinet's decision. Trudeau's Finance Minister Bill Morneau resigned after it emerged that he had taken his family on a ME to WE trip to Ecuador but was never billed for it.

On July 3, the government announced that Ottawa would take over the management of the program. However, it never did, and the CSSG was defunct. In August, the Kielburgers concluded that WE Charity's activities in Canada were no longer viable.

Since the controversy, some corporate and foundation donors which had been lost have returned. WE Charity continues to operate in the United States. As of September 2022, WE Charity's Toronto real estate portfolio was in the process of being sold to fund the continuation of its activities in Kenya, including its 37-bed Baraka Hospital and WE College, which confers certifications in nursing and tourism. The WE Charity Foundation now oversees WE's operations in Kenya with local management and government.

== Rangwala's analysis ==
Rangwala depicts the controversy surrounding the CSSG grant as motivated primarily by partisan politics. He concludes that WE Charity's relationship with the Trudeaus was the central cause of its misfortune, and cynically observes that Justin Trudeau himself emerged unscathed, leaving the Kielburgers as political "roadkill" in his wake.

Central to Rengwala's thesis is Canadian Ethics Commissioner Mario Dion's conclusion that "the creation and eventual ratification of the CSSG was not done improperly" and that there was no evidence of improper behaviour by either Justin Trudeau or Bill Morneau. Rangwala argues that the choice of WE Charity Foundation to manage the CSSG program made perfect sense in light of its track record of engagement with schools and students across the country.

Rangwala presents ME to WE, which had been attacked by many commenters, as an innovative model which has proved successful for other charities. Literary Review of Canada's Ian Smillie supports this characterization, writing that several independent reports show that, from 2014 through 2018, ME to WE contributed nearly $7 million, or 90% of its earnings, to WE Charity as well as paying the Kielburgers' annual salaries and benefits of $125,000. "Such a possibility," he continues, "was never seriously considered by the Kielburgers’ critics, however. They simply wrote the social enterprise off as a cover for the brothers’ grift."

A recurring metaphor in the book is the Tall poppy syndrome, by which Rangwala means an endemic Canadian impulse to tear down those who seem to have accomplished too much. "The bottom line is that for a subset of Canadians who watched the Kielburgers with a mix of amazement and jealousy," he writes, "the CSSG controversy and ensuing avalanche of criticism provided the aha moment they had long hoped for."

While generally presenting a full-throated defense of WE Charity and the Kielburgers, Rangwala also criticizes what he views as the charity's own missteps, for example what he sees as WE's overly casual approach to corporate partnerships, writing, "And you do not recruit captains of industry like Facebook COO Sheryl Sandberg, KPMG Global chairman Bill Thomas, and Virgin Group founder Richard Branson to champion your cause unless you are focused and on message."

== Critical reception ==
The book has received generally positive reviews accompanied by some criticisms.

Writing for Literary Review of Canada, Ian Smillie writes that Rangwala's detailed review "refutes most of the charges [against WE Charity] convincingly," adding that "It isn't all that difficult."

Smillie compares the Kielburgers' rise to prominence and 2020 media firestorm to the story of Icarus. He speculates that the young Craig Kielburger's reception on Oprah Winfrey and 60 Minutes and subsequent honors, including both brothers' induction into the Order of Canada, led to the belief that, with effort, the Kielburgers could accomplish anything.

Smillie criticizes Rangwala for focusing primarily upon the controversy rather than the substance of WE Charity's work, notably excepting its efforts in Kenya, and for exaggerating the novelty of WE Charity's community engagement approach. Commenting that "Ending poverty is not child play," Smille suggests that the Kielburgers took an overly simplistic view of challenges which had proven difficult for many others to overcome. While Rangwala rejects the label "voluntourism" to describe WE Charity's approach, Smillie finds it an apt characterization of ME to WE's African volunteer travel packages, observing that 40,000 high school students traveled to Kenya alone.

"The central issue of the book," writes Matt Henderson in Winnipeg Free Press, "rests in the author's poignant question: 'Why were people so quick to accept that WE and the Kielburgers were up to no good?'" He encapsulates one common line of criticism by referring to Austrian philosopher and theologian Ivan Illich's 1968 speech "To Hell with Good Intentions", in which Illich attacked wealthy North Americans' volunteer efforts in underdeveloped countries as motivated by self-fulfillment and the spread of global capitalism, calling them "'salesmen' for a delusive ballet in the ideas of democracy, equal opportunity and free enterprise among people who haven't the possibility of profiting from these." He criticizes the Kielburgers for courting the world's wealthy elites and asks rhetorically, "If the dream is to ensure equity and sustainability throughout this country and the world, could we not begin by ensuring that those with the most pay their fair share?"
