= YTA =

YTA may refer to:

- Pembroke Airport, Ontario, Canada with IATA code YTA
- Youth Taking Action
- YTA TV, an American television network formerly known as Youtoo America
