= Marc Kielburger =

Canadian human rights activist (born 1977)

Marc Kielburger CM OMC
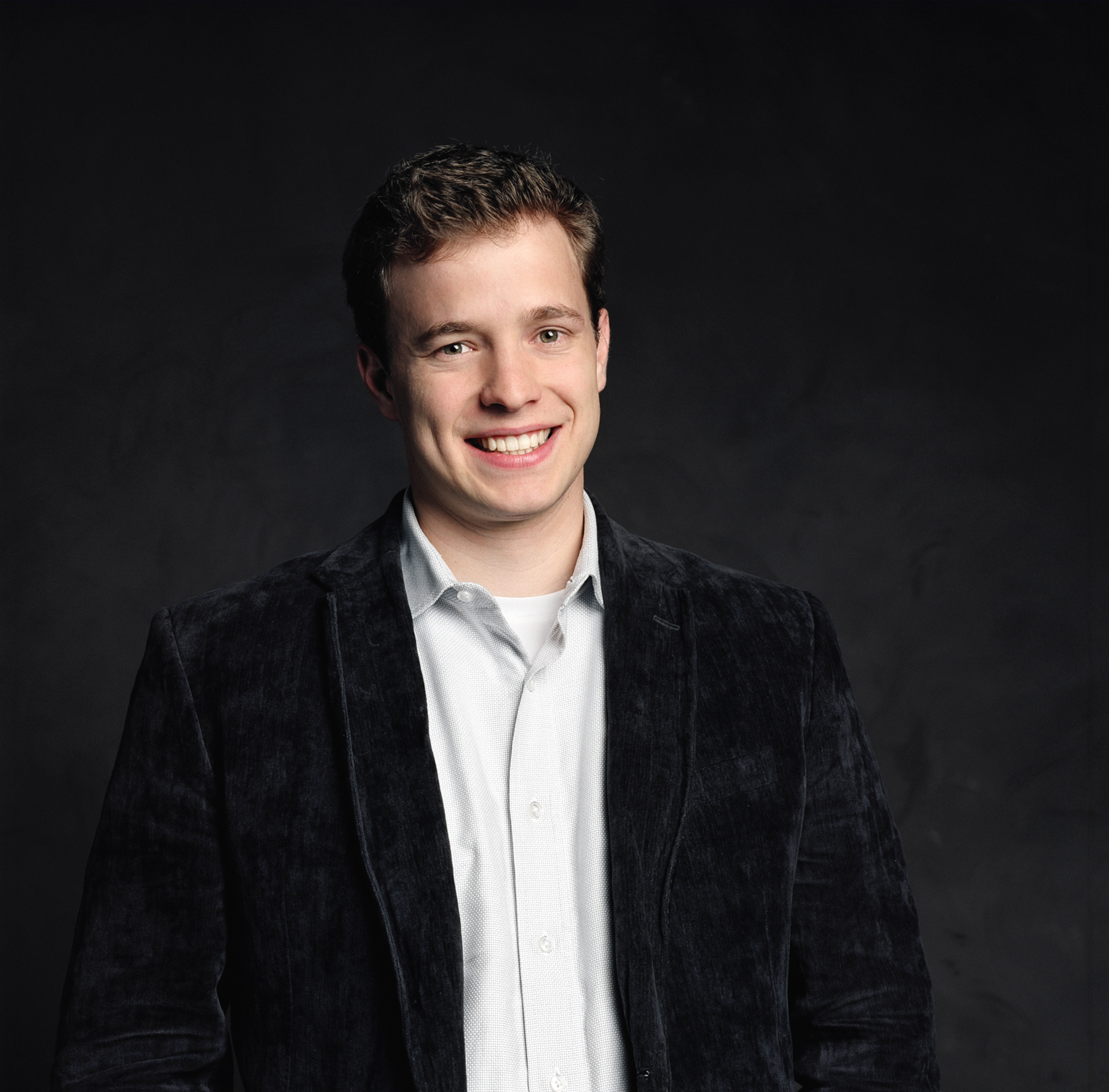
- Kielburger in 2008
- Born: 1977 (age 48–49); Thornhill, Ontario, Canada
- Education: Harvard University (AB); University College, Oxford (BA)
- Occupations: Social entrepreneur; author; columnist; humanitarian
- Known for: Co-founder of WE Charity and Me to We
- Notable work: Me To WE
- Spouse: Roxanne Joyal
- Children: 2
- Relatives: Craig Kielburger (brother)
- Awards: Ontario Medal for Good Citizenship (1998); Order of Canada (2010)
- Website: www.marckielburger.com

Marc Kielburger CM OMC (born 1977) is a Canadian author, social entrepreneur, columnist, humanitarian and activist for children's rights. He is the co-founder, along with his brother Craig, of the We Movement, which consists of the WE Charity, an international development and youth empowerment organization; Me to We, a for-profit company selling lifestyle products, leadership training and travel experience; and We Day, an annual youth empowerment event. In 2010, he was named a member of the Order of Canada by the Governor General of Canada.

== Early years and education ==
Kielburger was born in 1977 to schoolteachers Fred and Theresa Kielburger. At age 13, he became involved in environmental activism, founding clubs, starting petitions and eventually becoming the youngest person ever to receive the Ontario Medal for Good Citizenship. He traveled to Jamaica on a school program, where he volunteered at a hospice for teenage mothers and at a leper colony. In 1990, Kielburger won the award for Best Junior Project at the Canada-Wide Science Fair, going on to win another CWSF award in 1992.

Kielburger attended Brebeuf College School in Toronto, Ontario, and Neuchâtel Junior College in Neuchâtel, Switzerland, graduating from both in 1995. In the same year, he was named a Jostens Loran Scholar and enrolled in the University of Ottawa before transferring to Harvard University, where he later received a degree in International Relations. In 2000, he was awarded a Rhodes Scholarship and attended University College, Oxford, where he received an undergraduate law degree (BA).

Kielberger played rugby in high school, in college and in law school. In 1994, he suffered a serious left ankle injury during a high school rugby scrum. After the injury, Kielburger spent seven months on crutches with his ankle in a cast. Following several months of physical therapy, he resumed playing rugby in college and law school, but was often on the bench as his weak ankle was repeatedly reinjured.

== Activism and social entrepreneurship ==
While Marc Kielburger was studying at Harvard, his younger brother Craig read a story in the newspaper about the murder of a former child labourer in Pakistan. The story inspired Craig to urge world leaders to oppose the practice of child labour. In 1995, Craig and Marc co-founded Free the Children (later renamed We Charity). Marc's work with Free the Children has included co-creating ME to WE, a social enterprise organization that supports WE Charity with half its profits, and WE Day, an annual youth empowerment event held in large stadiums in cities across Canada, the U.S. and the U.K. Kielburger later co-founded Leaders Today, an organization that trains young people to develop skills and confidence to effect social change.

In 2008, the Kielburgers appeared on the Oprah Winfrey Show, where they launched a partnership with Oprah's Angel Network.

Kielburger's work has been recognized through an Ashoka fellowship. He was named Most Admired CEO in Canada in the Public Sector 2015.

Kielburger is a member of the board of directors of Freshii. Kielburger also contributes a column to The Globe and Mail.

On September 9, 2020, WE Charity announced that it was winding down its operations in Canada and selling its assets to establish an endowment that will help sustain ongoing WE Charity projects around the world. The announcement also said that the existing board of directors, the existing Canadian employees, and the Kielburgers would leave WE Charity Canada. The decision to wind down Canadian operations was attributed to the financial condition of the organization caused by the controversy surrounding the CSSG program and COVID-19.

On January 15, 2024, Martin Luther King's 95th birthday, the National Football League announced a five-year commitment to Realizing the Dream, a partnership between the Martin Luther King III Foundation and a charity Kielberger co-founded called Legacy+, in which the NFL said that all of its teams would be participating. The initiative calls youth, teachers and communities across the United States and the world to perform 100 million hours of community service by Martin Luther King's 100th birthday in 2029.

That night, King's oldest son and former Southern Christian Leadership Conference president Martin Luther King III appeared at Tampa's Raymond James Stadium for the NFC Wild Card Game, where he and his family stood at midfield for the pregame coin toss. Before the coin toss, King III was interviewed about the project, with Tampa mayor Jane Castor and former mayor Pam Iorio in attendance, where he said, "Certainly (the elder King) wanted to eradicate what he defined were the triple evils: poverty, racism and violence. But he also believed in civility and being together, and we could disagree without being disagreeable. Unfortunately, our nation is at a divided point. That’s sort of why football games and championships are so important, because they bring people together, from every walk of life."

Several weeks later, on February 5, the Cincinnati Reds announced that it, too, had joined the Realizing the Dream initiative, with Martin Luther King III appearing at the Cincinnati's Great American Ball Park for the occasion. On January 13, 2025, the National Basketball Association team Washington Wizards and Monumental Sports & Entertainment Foundation announced that they, too, would join the partnership with Realizing the Dream.

Kielburger and his brother Craig wrote a book with Martin Luther King III and his wife Arndrea Waters King titled What Is My Legacy?: Realizing a New Dream of Connection, Love and Fulfillment. Contributors to the book include the Dalai Lama, Julia Roberts, Yara Shahidi, Jay Shetty, Al Sharpton and Sanjay Gupta. The book is scheduled for release on January 14, 2025, the day before what would have been Martin Luther King Jr.'s 96th birthday. Excerpts from the book were republished in People magazine.

On January 13, 2025, iHeartMedia announced that it had partnered with Legacy+ and The Martin Luther King III Foundation to produce a podcast series called My Legacy. The first episode of My Legacy aired on January 20, Martin Luther King Jr. Day, with a new podcast scheduled to appear each Monday thereafter. Hosted by Martin Luther King III, Arndrea Waters King and Legacy+ founders Craig Kielburger and Marc Kielburger, the podcast is to feature guests including Billy Porter, David Oyelowo, Mel Robbins and Martin Sheen joined by their family members and friends to discuss their lives.

== Canada Student Service Grant program ==
In June 2020, the Canadian government announced it had chosen WE Charity to run its new Canada Student Service Grant program. The selection of WE Charity led to accusations of favouritism, since the government would be outsourcing a massive federal aid program to a private organization with ties to Canadian Prime Minister Justin Trudeau and his family. In July 2020, Marc Kielburger and fellow WE Charity co-founder Craig Kielburger announced they were pulling out of the grant contract due to the controversy it created.

On June 30, 2020, the Canadian Press published a video of Marc Kielburger telling youth leaders earlier in the month that Trudeau's office had contacted WE Charity to see if the organization would administer the student aid program. Kielburger later said that he had mistakenly referred to the Prime Minister's Office. The Prime Minister's Office also denied direct contact with WE Charity. Kielburger said the outreach came instead from officials at Employment and Social Development Canada.

== Biohacking ==
In December 2024, Kielburger attended the world's largest anti-aging conference in Las Vegas, Nevada's Venetian and Palazzo Resort, where he was interviewed by Financial Post's Joe O'Connor characterized Kielburger as a "biohacker".

Kielburger's pain from his high-school ankle injury had grown worse with age. By the time he reached his 40s, Kielburger's left ankle was chronically inflamed to the point where it was painful to stand.

To ease his discomfort, Kielburger turned to physiotherapy and to alternative medicine without success. Then Kielburger travelled to a private clinic in San Jose, Costa Rica to receive stem cell injections in his ankle, a treatment, not available in Canada or the United States, and plasma exchanges.

In addition to physical pain, in 2020 Kielburger was suffering from depression. Kielburger began practicing daily meditation to manage his stress and overcome depression.

Kielburger now champions what he calls "three pillars" of wellness. The first pillar, integrative medicine, aims to improve health at the cellular level and reverse the symptoms of aging. In Canada, Kielburger received treatment from Tim Cook, a medical doctor specializing in longevity therapy. Cook applied the Dunedin Pace of Aging test, a form of blood analysis intended to measure aging and formulate a personalized ant-aging plan, including injections of Nicotinamide adenine dinucleotide and peptide therapy. The second pillar, biohacking, entails incremental changes to the body, including stem cell therapy, which he credits for having healed his ankle, and plasma exchange, which is intended to remove inflammatory agents from the bloodstream. The third pillar, according to Kielburger, is fulfillment, leading a purposeful and fulfilled life which expresses one’s core values while remaining connected to family and community.

Kielburger regularly wakes at 4:15 a.m., spends 30 minutes in a hyperbaric chamber, followed by a cold plunge, meditation and yoga, and morning walks along Lake Ontario with his dog. He then eats an organic vegetarian breakfast, exercises, and spends time with his family before starting work by 8:15 a.m.

Following years of these lifestyle changes, Kielburger's health had recovered, and his injury had substantially healed, allowing him to balance on his injured ankle and to jump during his workouts. He has since returned to playing rugby, and has introduced his daughter to the game.

In May 2025, at Dave Asprey's Biohacking Conference in Austin, Texas, Marc Kielburger introduced a program called "Unlimited Life". Led by Marc Kielburger, Craig Kielburger and Tim Cook along with Asprey, the program is based upon Kielburger's "three pillars" of wellness, namely longevity medicine, biohacking, and personal fulfillment. Participants undergo a twelve-month coached and personalized program, during which their health is continuously monitored with full-body CT scans and blood panels.

Kielburger described Unlimited Life as an answer to what he perceives as a crisis of purpose among executives and entrepreneurs, 50% of whom, he says, face mental health challenges. "They are chasing a version of success", he says, "that doesn't resonate with their identity". In addition to physical components, the program is said to include emotional and psychological elements, such as immersion in experiences related to patients' values and communities as well as brain optimization.

== Personal life ==
Kielburger is married to Roxanne Joyal. She is a Rhodes Scholar and a fellow Member of the Order of Canada. They have two daughters.

== Publications ==
- Kielburger, Craig; Kielburger, Marc (2002). Take Action! A Guide to Active Citizenship. John Wiley & Sons. ISBN 9780471271321. OCLC 51566318.
- Kielburger, Marc (2004). Take More Action. Thomson Nelson. ISBN 978-0771580352.
- Kielburger, Craig; Kielburger, Marc (2004). Me To We: Turning Self-Help on Its Head. John Wiley & Sons. ISBN 9780470835104. OCLC 55510177.
- Kielburger, Craig; Kielburger, Marc (2006). Me To We: Finding Meaning In A Material World. Fireside. ISBN 9780743294515. OCLC 71126899.
- Singh, Lekha; Kielburger, Marc (2007). The making of an activist. Friesens Corporation. ISBN 9781553831310. OCLC 319758042.
- Kielburger, Craig; Kielburger, Marc (2010). Global Voices. Greystone Books. ISBN 978-1553658016.
- Kielburger, Craig; Branson, Holly; Kielburger, Marc (2018). WEconomy: You Can Find Meaning, Make A Living, and Change the World. John Wiley & Sons. ISBN 978-1-119-44781-8.
