= Youth Taking Action =

- Founded: 2003
- Founder: Guatam Jain
- Defunct: 2015
- Headquarters: California
- Website: www.youthtakingaction.org (defunct)

Youth Taking Action (YTA) was a California registered non-profit organization that promoted youth involvement in philanthropy. YTA was managed by a group of student representatives from the United States, Canada, and India. Guatam Jain, at the time a middle school student in California, was inspired to create a philanthropic organization after reading Craig Kielburger's book Free the Children in the summer of 2003. The organization ceased activities in 2013, and it was de-registered in California in 2015.

YTA has received seed funding from Youth Venture, a non-profit organization launched by the Ashoka Foundation in 1996.

== Programs ==
YTA hosted two programs intended to spread awareness about social issues affecting children.

The Share & Care Club encouraged teenagers to forgo a soda or a pack of chewing gum every month in favor of forwarding the funds to YTA select organizations.

The Birthday Club encouraged children to donate to charities on their birthdays.
