= WE Charity scandal =

Political scandal in Canada

A political scandal took place in Canada in 2020 regarding the awarding of a federal contract to WE Charity to administer the $912 million Canada Student Service Grant program (CSSG). The controversy arose when it was revealed that the WE charity had previously paid close family members of Prime Minister Justin Trudeau to appear at its events, despite making claims to the contrary. In total, Craig Kielburger confirmed at a parliamentary committee, WE Charity paid approximately $425,000 to Trudeau's family including expenses. WE Charity also used pictures of Trudeau's family members as celebrity endorsements in their application. Trudeau stated that WE Charity had been uniquely capable of administering the program as "the only possible option", and that it was the civil service, not him, who decided that WE Charity was the best option. It was noted that not only had the charity employed a daughter of former Finance Minister Bill Morneau but a close relationship existed between the minister and members of its staff.

Other organizations, such as the Public Service Alliance of Canada and YMCA Canada, expressed skepticism at the claim that WE Charity was the only organization in Canada capable of administering the contract. Evidence discovered by parliamentary committees investigating the scandal suggested a significant degree of preferential treatment given to WE Charity by the civil service, as, while WE Charity was allowed to repeatedly revise its proposals for the program (a common occurrence in sole-source contracts), no call for proposals was ever issued, nor were any received from any other organization. Reports also indicated that this was further amplified by pressure from Morneau to make the selection.

Ethics Commissioner Mario Dion's report on the involvement of Trudeau, entitled The Trudeau III Report, confirmed his assertion that Canada's civil service had recommended WE Charity to manage the Canada Student Service Grant program. Dion found that on 22 May 2020 Trudeau agreed to their recommendation following a briefing on the previous day in which they conveyed their determination that WE was the only existing organization capable of managing the nationwide program upon short notice. The report exonerated Trudeau in the scandal, commenting: "In light of the evidence gathered in this examination and for the reasons outlined above, I find that Mr. Trudeau did not contravene subsection 6(1), section 7 or section 21 of the Act." He added: "In my view, the creation and eventual ratification of the (Canada Student Services Grant) was not done improperly."

In his final report entitled The Morneau II Report, Dion ruled that Morneau had contravened sections 6(1), 7, and 21 of the Federal Conflict of Interest Act. In the ruling, Dion stated: "The examination found the relationship between Mr. Morneau and WE included an unusually high degree of involvement between their representatives and afforded WE unfettered access to the Office of the Minister of Finance, which amounted to preferential treatment." Dion also ruled that this preferential treatment was a result of the close friendship between Bill Morneau and members of WE Charity. Dion added that "this unfettered access to the Office of the Minister of Finance was based on the identity of WE's representative, Mr. Craig Kielburger", who was both a constituent and close friend of Bill Morneau.

In a piece authored for the editorial board of The Cornwall Seeker, forensic accountant, professor and Founding President of the Canadian Academic Accounting Association L.S. Rosen examined allegations of impropriety surrounding the Canadian Student Service Grant program and determined them to be unfounded, writing that "several seemed launched to support attacks on other politicians" and that "WE became "collateral damage" in a battle for political power." Writing for Education Canada, Professors Karen Mundy of the Ontario Institute for Studies in Education and Kelly Gallagher-Mackay of Wilfrid Laurier University said that, amidst a crisis in Canadian education, WE Charity was prevented from fulfilling its commission, with thousands of youth volunteer tutors sidelined due to the appearance of scandal. Rosen summarized, "A generation of young people lost the opportunity to volunteer and help their country in a time of need."

== Early events ==
On April 5, 2020, amidst the COVID-19 pandemic, the Prime Minister of Canada, Justin Trudeau, and his then-Finance Minister Bill Morneau, held a telephone conversation discussing measures to financially assist the country's student population. The Finance Department was tasked with devising a series of measures to address these issues. The previous month, Canada's official statistics bureau Statistics Canada had measured a record-high unemployment rate of 42.1% among returning post-secondary students aged 20 to 24, a third of which had lost their summer jobs due to the COVID-19 pandemic.

On April 9, 2020, prime minister Justin Trudeau announced several measures intended to supplement existing programs supporting Canadian business and youths during the COVID-19 pandemic. In addition to instituting new relief programs, such as the Canada Summer Jobs program, Trudeau promised to create a Canada Student Service Grant program, which would further mitigate the COVID-19 pandemic's economic impact upon Canadian students by allowing students who couldn't find work to receive federal grants for performing volunteer service.

The opposition Conservative Party had criticized Trudeau's existing programs for excluding many businesses and others who needed assistance, and warned of economic catastrophe if the government didn't release funds soon. Responding to those criticisms, Trudeau said that the government intended to create broadly-focused programs which would provide assistance to a large number of people in a short time frame, and that the programs would quickly evolve to include those who didn't initially qualify. "We recognize we are not aiming for perfection", Trudeau said. "We want to make these measures as effective and inclusive as we can...So we're listening and making adjustments along the way."

Over two months later, on Thursday, June 25, 2020, the federal government officially launched the Canada Student Service Grant program, which had been anxiously awaited by students and charities alike. Speaking at a news conference in Ottawa that morning, Trudeau said, "Students are facing unique challenges this summer due to the pandemic. At the same time, many are wondering how they can help in the fight against COVID-19. So, today, we're launching the new Canada student service grant, which will allow post-secondary students and recent grads to gain valuable experience while also contributing to their communities."

The program, set to run through October 31, 2020, would pay eligible post-secondary students who couldn't find summer jobs up to $5,000 for volunteer work related to the effects of the COVID-19 pandemic. For every 100 volunteer hours performed, participants would receive a $1,000 grant paid as a lump sum upon completion. The program was open to students who were enrolled in a recognized post-secondary education program and to recent graduates up to 30 years old who had completed their studies no earlier than December 2019. In addition to grants for volunteer work, participating students would be eligible for an emergency benefit of $1,250/month.

WE Charity would have been responsible for connecting applicants with volunteer opportunities and for distributing grants to program participants For administering the $912 million program, WE Charity was to receive $43.53 million, of which $8.75 million was eligible to be shared with other charity and non-profit partners in directing the volunteers.

An online platform called "I Want to Help" provided details about the program and directed students to non-profits which were seeking volunteers. By the end of the day the platform opened, there were 23,000 placements listed, with new listings to be added through August 21, 2020. Among the charitable organizations seeking volunteers were Scouts Canada, Girl Guides of Canada, the Tim Horton Children's Foundation, Kids Help Phone and Rotary Canada as well as WE Charity. The Public Health Agency of Canada mandated that opportunities supported by the CSSG honor social distancing requirements and other health and safety precautions. Charities which had already moved to virtual volunteering were the quickest to register to the website. Within the first week of the program's launch, 35,000 students and recent graduates had applied.

Some foreign students studying in Canada criticized the program for reserving grants for Canadian nationals, with the University of Winnipeg Student Association's international students codirectors Else Owusu and Francisca Idigbe writing: "COVID-19 has created unprecedented disruption for international students across Canada, International students are struggling to make ends meet and need support. We are calling on the federal government to provide income support to international students."

Opposition Conservatives criticized the program for coming too late, with Conservative employment critic Dan Albas and youth critic Raquel Dancho releasing a joint statement complaining that many students had finished their classes two months prior. "While we are pleased that the Liberal government has finally listened," the statement read, "once again they have been slow to act. We are already two months into summer – every day the Liberals delay support or refuse to fix their programs, Canadians fall through the cracks. Conservatives will continue to advocate relentlessly for all Canadians left behind by Trudeau and his Liberal government."

Through a no-bid selection process, WE Charity was chosen to administer the CSSG, which would have created grants for students who volunteered during the COVID-19 pandemic. The contract agreement was signed with WE Charity Foundation, a corporation affiliated with WE Charity, on June 23, 2020. It was agreed that WE Charity, which had already begun incurring eligible expenses for the project on May 5 at their own risk, would be paid $43.53 million to administer the program; $30 million of which was paid to WE Charity Foundation on June 30, 2020. This was later fully refunded. A senior bureaucrat would note that "ESDC thinks that 'WE' might be able to be the volunteer matching third party ... The mission of WE is congruent with national service and they have a massive following on social media."

At the same time, and prior to the announcement of the CSSG on June 25, 2020, WE Charity was simultaneously corresponding with the government agencies ultimately responsible for choosing the administrator of the program. WE Charity would submit several proposals in April, beginning on April 9, 2020, about youth volunteer award programs. These were reformulated into what became the CSSG.

== Announcement and reactions ==
Soon after Trudeau unveiled the Canada Student Service Grant program, both the program itself and the selection of WE Charity to administer it were subjected to criticism of three kinds. The first lines of criticism, from opposition MPs and likeminded voices in the press, centered around the charge that WE Charity had been selected due to conflicts of interest between Trudeau, his government and WE Charity. These were to prove the most damaging to the government and to the charity, leading to an Ethics Commission investigation which was ultimately to clear Trudeau of wrongdoing.

The opposition parties at the time were the Conservatives and their allies in the Conservative Party of Quebec and Bloc Québécois, as well as New Democrats, which had positioned itself to the left of the relatively centrist governing Liberals. Conservative MPs Pierre Poilievre, Dan Albas and Raquel Dancho demanded an official investigation into the circumstances surrounding the Trudeau government's decision to select WE Charity to administer the program, a call echoed by Duff Conacher's Democracy Watch website. New Democrat Charlie Angus speculated that WE Charity needed a bailout following financial troubles related to the COVID-19 pandemic, while Alain Rayes of the Conservative Party of Quebec and Rhéal Fortin of Bloc Québécois questioned whether WE Charity was capable of operating in Francophone Canada.

Some in the non-profit sector objected to the structure of the CSSG, regardless of who was to administer it. Volunteer Canada felt that payments to volunteers blurred the line between volunteerism and wage labor, but allowed their volunteer centers to participate alongside WE Charity in the program.

Finally, there were some who felt that they should have been included in the program's administration. The Public Service Alliance of Canada, a labour union representing federal employees, disputed the civil service's conclusion that a third party was needed to deliver the CSSG in a timely manner, while YMCA Canada objected that the civil service hadn't contacted them to seek a bid.

=== WE Charity as the only possible option ===
The government insisted that, of all the third-party organizations in Canada, WE Charity had been identified as the "only possible option" capable of undertaking the program. On June 29, 2020, Justin Trudeau said that "as the Public Service dug into it, they came back with only one organization that was capable of networking, and organizing, and delivering this program on the scale that we needed it, and that was the WE program." President Chris Aylward, president of the Public Service Alliance, which represents government employees, said the public service should have been asked to administer the program itself.

Employment and Social Development Canada's senior assistant deputy minister Rachel Wernick said that WE Charity was the only organization to submit a proposal for the CSSG and that no other organizations were asked to do so. These same government employees indicated that other major organizations such as YMCA Canada and United Way had been considered, but at no point did the government contact these agencies. This was despite the fact that the government had been in contact and collaboration with WE Charity regarding the program for at least a month prior. In a statement directly challenging the assertion that WE Charity was the only charity in Canada capable of administering the program, Peter Dinsdale, president and CEO of YMCA Canada, told CTV News in an interview: "At no point did the government contact YMCA Canada about delivering that program." He added that his organization "absolutely" would have been capable of administering the program. Dinsdale however noted that "It would have been tough given the state of YMCAs across the country, given the impact of COVID — really fighting for basic survival," continuing, "In normal times, (this) 100 per cent would have been something we could have done."

=== Potential conflicts of interest ===
On July 9, 2020, WE Charity released a statement detailing previous engagements with several members of the famous Trudeau family who had spoken at a number of WE Charity-related events. The majority of these involved Margaret Trudeau, former Prime Minister Pierre Trudeau's ex-wife and longtime advocate for charitable causes, who had received a total of nearly $250,000 to speak at 28 WE Charity-related events between 2016 and 2020.

The fees were paid by Speakers' Spotlight, a Toronto-based Speakers bureau which had been commissioned by WE Charity-affiliated ME to WE social enterprise. Margaret Trudeau's son, Justin's brother Alexandre Trudeau, spoke at 8 WE Charity-related events and received $32,000 in speaking fees from the same speaker's bureau.

WE Charity also said that Justin Trudeau's then-wife Sophie Grégoire Trudeau had received $1,400 to appear at a WE Charity-related youth event in 2012, over three years before the younger Trudeau became Prime Minister. Following her appearance, Grégoire-Trudeau volunteered alongside her mother-in-law as an official "celebrity ambassador" for WE Charity and hosted a podcast which highlighted its work. Their participation in the charity's work was highlighted in its revised proposal for the CSSG program."

A spokesperson for the Prime Minister's office had stated the previous day, July 8, that neither Justin Trudeau nor his wife had ever received money from WE Charity.

Following WE Charity's disclosures, Conservative Party finance critic Pierre Poilievre said that Parliament should be recalled in order to investigate the matter. Posting on Twitter, Poilievre accused Trudeau of having personally intervened to ensure that WE Charity was entrusted with administering the CSSG program, and compared the Canadian government to those of Venezuela and Zimbabwe. Bloc Quebecois leader Yves-Francois Blanchet went further, demanding that Trudeau step aside and be replaced by Deputy Prime Minister Chrystia Freeland until Ethics Commissioner Mario Dion's investigation, which would conclude in May 2021, was complete.

The next day, July 10, Finance Minister Bill Morneau's office confirmed that his adopted daughter Grace Acan, whose immigration to Canada Northern Uganda the Morneau family sponsored in 2010, was working for WE Charity, while another of his daughters, Clare Morneau, had volunteered to speak at several WE Charity-related events after having published a book called Kakuma Girls about schoolgirls living in a refugee camp in Kenya and was featured in a "Future 50" portrait series honoring young Canadian activists.

New Democrat ethics critic Charlie Angus asked Ethics Commissioner Mario Dion to extend his ongoing investigation to include Morneau. Angus' Conservative counterpart Michael Barrett called for an investigation by the Royal Canadian Mounted Police.

On July 16, Youth Minister Bardish Chagger was the first of a number of government officials to testify before the House of Commons Finance Committee about the CSSG program. Chagger said that it was the civil service, rather than the Prime Minister, his cabinet or his staff, which recommended that WE Charity administer the program, and that she then presented this recommendation to the cabinet. Chagger testified that she did not have any conversations with Trudeau's or Morneau's office about the planned role for the charity in the CSSG.

Chagger was followed by Rachel Wernick, senior assistant deputy minister at Employment and Social Development Canada. Wernick said that the elements of the civil service which otherwise might have taken responsibility for the program were all preoccupied with other emergency pandemic measures. Corroborating Chagger's testimony, Warnick called WE Charity an "obvious option" and said that,having in mid-April considered other charities to take on administrative responsibility for the CSSG, she recommended WE Charity to Chagger due to its experience coordinating youth volunteers and its ability to implement programs quickly and on a national scale.

On the morning of July 21, Canada's top public servant, Privy Council clerk Ian Shugart, testified before the Finance Committee.. Shugart asserted that, while Trudeau had been briefed about the development of the Canada Student Service Grant program, there was no evidence to suggest that Trudeau had communicated or interacted in any way with WE Charity prior to the civil service's selection of the charity to administer it.

In the House of Commons itself, Trudeau and members of his cabinet were met with questions and accusations from opposition MPs. Conservative Party leader Andrew Scheer accused Liberals of using the pandemic as an opportunity for corruption, saying, "They will stop and take the time to reward their friends, that is the essence of this Liberal party, under this Liberal prime minister. I don't even have a question. It's just disgusting,"

New Democratic Party leader Jagmeet Singh demanded in a news conference that Trudeau waive the usual protocol of confidentiality in cabinet discussions, saying, "To deal with all these concerns, not having a job, the future, a pandemic, people need to have confidence in their government."

On July 22, Finance Minister Bill Morneau told the Finance Committee that he had reimbursed WE Charity for $41,366 in travel expenses that the charity had incurred in 2017 after inviting Morneau and his family to Ecuador and Kenya to see its international development work in progress.

WE Charity said that it facilitated such trips on the belief that donors would contribute more if they saw the charity's work firsthand. Morneau said that he made two $50,000 donations to WE Charity subsequent to his tour, and that he hadn't realized that he wasn't invoiced for the travel expenses.

Opposition Conservatives accused Morneau of having violated the Conflict of Interest Act and called for him to resign. New Democrat Charlie Angus urged caution, saying, "Let's get answers and then let's make decisions. Let's let the conflict of interest commissioner do his work."

On July 28, WE Charity's founders, Craig Kielburger and Marc Kielburger, appeared before the Finance committee. Liberal MPs on the committee argued in favor of WE Charity's selection to administer the CSSG program, while opposition MPs sought to find holes in the Kielburgers' testimony, with questions focused primarily on how Trudeau's family and ministers interacted with WE Charity.

In his opening remarks, Craig Kielburger said that the civil service selected WE Charity to administer the CSSG due to its experience in rapidly implementing youth service initiatives in both Canada and the United States at a national scale. Craig Kielburger told MPs that WE Charity agreed to the government's request that it administer the CSSG because it wanted to help Canadian students, and denied that the charity stood to profit from the program.

Conservative finance critic Pierre Poilievre led the questioning, asking about a speech Marc Kielburger had given to student volunteers in which he said that the Prime Minister's Office had phoned the charity to ask them to administer the CSSG program. Kielburger testified that he'd spoken in error, and that the Civil Service's Employment and Social Development Canada was the charity's only point of contact in the government. Kielburger also denied that Justin Trudeau had invited the charity to join official celebrations of Canada's sesquicentennial. Finance committee chair Wayne Easter threatened to shut down the proceedings when Poilievre repeatedly interrupted the Kielburgers' testimony.

Craig Kielberger testified that his relationship to the Trudeau family was confined to business, and that neither he nor Marc Kielburger had ever met or spent time with them in a casual setting. Margaret Trudeau, he said, was sought as a speaker and Sophie Grégoire Trudeau as an ambassador due to their histories of mental health advocacy. The Kielburgers pointed out that former New Democrat Alberta premier Rachel Notley had also spoken at a WE Day event, while former Conservative Prime Minister Stephen Harper's wife, Laureen Harper, had in 2013 hosted a reception for the Kielburgers at 24 Sussex.

A month prior, responding on the evening of June 23 to an inquiry from CBC News, a WE Charity spokesperson said Margaret Trudeau, Sophie Grégoire Trudeau and Justin Trudeau had spoken at WE Charity-related events in the preceding years and that WE Charity had never paid them honoraria for doing so. The spokesperson said that Grégoire Trudeau's advocacy as ambassador was performed as a volunteer, with WE Charity paying only travel expenses. Craig Kielburger attributed the spokesperson's statement to confusion amidst a flurry of inquiries from the press, and to the fact that the fees, paid by ME to WE rather than WE Charity, were processed through a speaking agency, excepting some which had been billed to WE Charity in error.

On the afternoon of July 30, Prime Minister Justin Trudeau and his chief of staff Katie Telford appeared before the Finance Committee. That morning, prior to Trudeau's appearance, Conservative Leader Andrew Scheer outlined the questions opposition MPs were to ask Trudeau, focusing primarily upon the reasons WE Charity was selected to administer the CSSG. Trudeau was questioned for an hour and a half, which the opposition unsuccessfully attempted to extend to three hours.

Trudeau testified that he wasn't aware until May 8 that the civil service had selected WE Charity to administer the CSSG program, and that he hadn't previously discussed WE Charity with any of his staff in relation to the CSSG, and that he'd never spoken to the Kielburgers about the program. Trudeau said that he removed the decision from that day's cabinet agenda and asked the civil service to determine if there were other organizations, such as the recently created Canada Service Corps, which might administer the program.

On May 21, Trudeau said, Employment and Social Development Canada responded that WE Charity was the only group able to implement the program at such short notice, and the proposal was approved the following day."The choice," he said, was not between providers. It was between going ahead with WE Charity to deliver the program or not going ahead with the program at all."

Questioned by Pierre Poilievre, Trudeau stated that he had no conflict of interest, emphasizing the ethics commissioner's determination that Sophie Gregoire Trudeau's work with WE Charity was unproblematic, and said that the student grant program would not benefit his family in any way. Trudeau apologized for failing to formally recuse himself from the discussion, attributing this failure to the speed at which the government was assembling responses to the pandemic.

When asked if he still believed that WE Charity was capable of managing the CSSG, Trudeau replied, "We will never know because they pulled out of being able to deliver the program, partially because I hadn't recused myself and created complications here. And that's something that I deeply regret."

It was claimed the Prime Minister's Office had no involvement in the selection process, and that the selection of WE Charity had been undertaken in a non-partisan manner by the public service. This claim, that there was no involvement from the PMO, was directly contradicted by two April 20 inter-governmental emails regarding the CSSG. The first, sent on April 20, 2020, by assistant deputy finance minister Michelle Kovacevic, read in part: "There has been a lot of back and forth on a student package, as you well know and PMO has been weighing in on a version we shared with our Minister on Saturday." In addition to this, deputy minister of intergovernmental affairs and youth Christiane Fox stated: "I understand WE has been in touch with some of you (or your teams) on a proposal they have for social innovation, picking up from discussions they had with us pre-Covid. I am told they met with Ministers NG, Chagger and others to discuss this + a revised version of the service program. They reached out today as they are also working with DPMO and PMO." Finally, the charity's revised proposal for administering the grant program, which was ultimately accepted by the government for the CSSG, included photos of the organization's "celebrity ambassadors" — among them, the prime minister's mother and wife.

Bill Morneau and his family were also found to have accepted travel expenditures paid for on behalf of WE Charity, some of which was retroactively reimbursed by Morneau over the course of the scandal. Additionally, one of Morneau's daughters was found to be directly employed by the charity; while another daughter spoke at multiple WE Charity events and was featured in WE's "Future 50" portrait series. During the events of the scandal, an internal-exchange between members of the Finance Department was disclosed wherein the personal relationship between Morneau and the Kielburgers was described as that of "besties"; furthermore, Morneau's office was found to be a key player in the decision to choose WE Charity.

New claims and questions about cronyism surfaced on February 26, 2021, in front of a House of Commons Ethics Committee. Committee MP's questioned a former WE Charity employee asking if the $41,000 in unpaid vacation fees that former Finance Minister Bill Morneau owed to WE Charity could have been perceived as a bribe for the multimillion-dollar tax payer grant he later provided to WE Charity.

=== Effects of COVID-19 on WE Charity ===
Prior to the awarding of the contract, WE Charity had been facing difficulties along with the greater economy due to the effects of COVID-19. Consequently, it had undergone significant layoffs in the period prior to the inception of the CSSG.

Many of these personnel were able to be rehired as a result of the awarding of the program. This was referred to by Charlie Angus, the NDP Shadow Critic, as a bailout for friends of the Liberal Party. In March 2020, a significant proportion of the board of directors at WE Charity had been abruptly replaced. WE Charity stated that this had been typical conduct, as the contracts had expired naturally, but it was later revealed that the positions were slated to end on August 31, 2020, not March 2020.

WE Charity has repeatedly asserted it was in no financial distress prior to, or during the scandal. This claim is challenged by the fact that on July 12, 2020, it laid off hundreds of staff, followed by the sale of its Canadian real-estate and more layoffs in August, before eventually closing all of its Canadian operations by September.

Writing for the Cornwall Seeker, forensic accountant L.S. Rosen refuted the notion that the Student Grant program amounted to a public "bail-out" of WE Charity, finding preexisting assets sufficient to support WE's continuing operations while the structure of the program did not allow the possibility of any net gains.

=== Lobbying Act ===
On August 13, 2020, WE Charity formally registered as a lobbying organization for the purposes of Canada's federal Lobbying Act, which covers most forms of communication with the government. The act requires organizations to register within two months of the point when the combined communications of all its employees reaches or exceeds 20% of one employees' workload over a one-month period. WE Charity logged 65 communications between 18 WE Charity employees and 19 federal offices. The majority of these communications, primarily with Employment and Social Development Canada, took place after April 19, when federal officials contacted WE Charity asking for advice and assistance in launching the CSSG, WE Charity executive director Dalal Al -Waheidi said that, in previous years, communications with government had amounted to only between one and three percent of the charity's time.

The previous month, Conservative MPs had asked federal Lobbying Commissioner Nancy Bélanger to determine whether WE Charity had violated the act by not registering as a lobbyist during its consultations with the civil service about the CSSG program. Former Liberal Party national director Jamie Carroll, who in 2013 was convicted and fined for having breached the act in connection with a National Defense contract, accused the commissioner's office of having given WE Charity a "sweetheart deal". Bélanger's spokesperson Marion Dion said that if the commissioner had reason to believe that the charity had broken the law she would be obliged to refer the matter to the RCMP.

Mark Blumberg, a lawyer with Blumberg Segal LLP, said that he advises his clients to register when communicating with the government becomes a significant portion of their activities because it can help them obtain meetings with government officials. Blumberg said that Al-Waheidi's figure of one to three percent was still a considerable amount in light of WE Charity's $65 million budget for 2017, and that the controversy had led other charities to pay more attention to the provisions of the act.

=== Administration in French-speaking Canada ===
On May 29, 2020, WE Charity contracted Quebec-based public relations firm National to help implement the CSSG program in Quebec and in other Francophone communities across the country, creating French-language content and reaching out to non-profit and student organizations. National had previously worked with WE Charity to organize WE Days and various smaller events. National worked on the CSSG until July 3, when the federal government took over the program. National declined to state how much they had received for their work on the project.

Opposition MPs Alain Rayes of the Conservative Party of Quebec and Rhéal Fortin of Bloc Québécois said that National's participation called into question the government's assertion that WE Charity was the only organization capable of effectively delivering the program on a national level.

Rayes said that, on the day Trudeau announced the program, National had approached Quebec Conservatives asking for a list of community-level charities which might need volunteers. Rayes called this "insulting to public service employees", because, he said, the government had already compiled this information for the Canada Summer Jobs program.

Fortin said that National called the office of Québécois party leader Yves-François Blanchet to discuss the CSSG and that Youth Minister Bardish Chagger's officer emailed different MPs asking them to suggest charities in their constituencies which might like to participate in the CSSG. Comparing the situation to the early 2000s sponsorship scandal under the Liberal governments of Jean Chrétien and Paul Martin, Fortin called for Trudeau and Finance Minister Bill Morneau to resign.

Conservative MP Richard Martel wrote official languages commissioner Raymond Théberge, saying that WE Charity could not deliver CSSG services in both official languages and asking him to investigate the matter. Théberge's spokesperson Sophie Lamontagne said she informed Martel that the commissioner's office would look into it.

Danielle Keenan, spokesperson for Youth Minister Bardish Chagger, said that WE Charity had been operating in Quebec for many years and had worked with over 450 French-language schools and other groups in the province. Keenan said that WE Charity was working with non-profits across Quebec to deliver the program in a manner that effectively responded to local needs.

=== Program structure and labour law ===
Paula Speevak, CEO of Volunteer Canada, which provides consulting services to non-profits, told the Globe and Mail that Volunteer Canada had expressed misgivings in April, after plans for the CSSG program were announced, that the CSSG's structure blurred the lines between volunteerism and paid work by paying the volunteers what she believed amounted to an hourly wage. After the program's official launch, Speevak said that WE Charity approached Volunteer Canada hoping that it would help connect WE with organizations that were looking for volunteers, but the national organization declined to participate for this reason. Speevak emphasized that they had no objections to the government's selection of WE Charity to administer it and that any of Volunteer Canada's over 200 local volunteer centres and associated groups were free to work alongside WE Charity in the program.

In early July, Aine McGlynn, CEO of The Good Partnership, which provides non-profits with advice on fundraising, wrote an open letter with several others in the non-profit sector expressing misgivings about the way the CSSG program was structured, saying that volunteerism was not a substitute for paid work and that the CSSG's grant timelines were unrealistic. The letter stated that opportunities posted to the I Want To Help website included translation, digital design and content creation, and that these would usually be considered paid work, Speaking with CBC News, McGlynn noted that the poor often can't afford to perform unpaid work and said, "It's a privilege to be able to volunteer".

Responding to these concerns, Youth Minister Bardish Chagger's spokesperson Danielle Keenan said that the program was unambiguously designed to support volunteer positions. Prime Minister Trudeau said that the concept of incentives for youth to serve their communities was well-established.

Toronto labour lawyer Andrew Langille contested Trudeau's statement, saying that Ontario's Employment Standards Act clearly distinguished paid work from volunteer work and that he believed CSSG opportunities technically qualified as paid work. Langille said, "The problem is when you blur the lines and start paying an hourly rate that is below the minimum wage...If they're employees, their compensation and benefits should include things like Canada Pension Plan and Employment Insurance premiums and workplace safety insurance. Any program that appears to deny young people their right to the minimum wage could be in violation of Ontario's Human Rights Code or even the federal Charter of Rights and Freedoms".

New Democrat MP Charlie Angus compared the situation to the 2008 recession and warned that the CSSG program threatened to institutionalize the already precarious nature of the gig economy, which had been devastated by the COVID-19 pandemic. Angus said, "Young people are desperate for the jobs. Should that be legal? I don't think so."

In addition to coordinating CSSG placements with other charities, WE Charity posted 450 CSSG volunteer positions within its own organization, including 200 openings at its Social Entrepreneurship Innovation Lab and 250 for digital content creators, with students allowed to volunteer from home. Lori Turnbull, director of the school of public administration at Dalhousie University, called WE Charity a well-respected organization but said that the listings might be construed as a form of profit, while Conservative MP Dan Albas said that they posed a potential conflict of interest.

== Demise of the CSSG ==
On July 3, 2020, WE Charity withdrew from the Canada Student Service Grant program. By September 8 of that year, WE Charity had repaid all the funds that Employment and Social Development Canada had granted them to administer the CSSG program. The charity took a $5 million loss on work preparing the CSSG program, some of which had been performed in the weeks preceding the cabinet's formal approval of its contract with the government.

=== Destruction of WE Charity in Canada ===
Ethics Commissioner Mario Dion's investigation of the program, which ultimately determined that the Trudeau government's selection of WE Charity to administer the CSSG had not been improper, was not to appear until May of the following year. In the meantime, damage from the controversy surrounding the program continued to compile.

On July 11, WE Charity laid off 450 workers who were under contract to administer the CSSG, while giving 15 others full-time positions. Four days later, WE Charity announced that WE Day student events, already unfeasible due to the pandemic, would be postponed indefinitely. WE Charity suspended its partnerships with Canadian schools boards and corporate sponsors, and said that it would move its WE Schools learning programs to a digital format as it would no longer have staff to work with teachers..The charity had previously been providing educational programs in 7,000 schools across Canada.

On July 28, WE Charity announced that it was "winding down" its operations in Canada, acknowledging that it found itself in the midst of a political battle it was not prepared to fight. The charity said that it would refocus its efforts to its various international aid initiatives, and launch a review of its organizational structure to reflect this.

On August 13, WE Charity announced that it would lay off 16 full-time employees at its Toronto headquarters and 19 employees at its London office. The London office would be closed, but the charity said it planned to continue its British operations. Speaking to the House of Commons finance committee, WE Charity executive director Dalal Al-Waheidi called the layoffs "incredibly difficult and emotional."

On September 9, with the pandemic still in full swing, and its reputation damaged by the controversy, WE Charity announced that it would end its operations in Canada, laying off 117 employees. The charity's operations in Britain and the United States would continue.

WE Charity founders Craig and Marc Kielburger released a statement saying, "Without decisive action, WE Charity's ongoing costs to operate in Canada would exceed revenue and consume savings that are essential to establish the endowment fund...We calculate that this action preserves as many humanitarian and educational programs as possible, for as long as possible. Putting children first means prioritizing them above the charity. This is a heartbreaking decision."

WE Charity attributed these decisions to financial damage from the pandemic and from the political controversy surrounding the CSSG, which led many corporate sponsors to end partnerships with the charity.

Executive director Dalal Al-Wahei told the House of Commons finance committee, "I could never have imagined that the combination of COVID-19 and the political fallout of agreeing to partner on the CSSG could be so devastating for WE Charity, our staff, and the communities we serve". WE Charity co-founder Craig Kielburger added, "When Employment and Social Development Canada asked us to administer the Canada Student Service Grant, we regret that we didn't recognize how this decision would be perceived...We would never have picked up the phone when the civil service called asking us to help young Canadians get through the pandemic if we had known the consequences."

Forensic accountant, professor and Founding President of the Canadian Academic Accounting Association L.S. Rosen examined allegations of impropriety surrounding the Canadian Student Service Grant program and determined them to be unfounded, writing that "several seemed launched to support attacks on other politicians" and that "WE became "collateral damage" in a battle for political power." Joe O'Connor of the Financial Post wrote, "The [Kielburger] brothers were never found to have done anything wrong, but their self-defence during the hearings registered with a giant thud among the public."

=== Endowment fund ===
In early August, WE Charity had said it was evaluating which of its real estate assets could be sold to fund its international operations. The profits from the sales would, along with the charity's remaining savings, be placed into an endowment fund to support and continue WE Charity's projects in Africa, Asia and Latin America, including Baraka Hospital and WE College in Kenya's Maasai country and the Agricultural Learning Center in Ecuador, as well as funding the completion of several projects already underway; however, no new initiatives would be launched. The endowment fund would be managed by an independent board of directors.

Among the properties to be sold were those on a block near Moss Park which had been intended to serve as a "campus for good" providing free space for youth-led charities. The charity had at first stated that it intended to keep its headquarters since 2017, the Global Learning Centre on Toronto's Queen Street, but on September 9 said that this would also be put on the market. At that time, WE Charity listed $42 million worth of properties in the Toronto area. A special committee of the board of directors would oversee the planned sale of the charity's properties,

=== Defamation lawsuits ===
On February 8, 2022, WE Charity filed a lawsuit in New York against the Canadian Broadcasting Company, alleging that portions of its controversy-era coverage were defamatory. The CBC sought to have the case dismissed, but its motion was denied. Several months earlier, in November 2021, founders Marc and Craig Kielburgers' mother, retired teacher Theresa Kielburger, had sued Jesse Brown and Canadaland.

==== WE Charity v. CBC ====
On February 8 2022, WE Charity's New York-based affiliate filed a lawsuit against the Canadian Broadcasting Corporation (CBC) for defamation. The 230-page complaint was filed in the United States District Court for the District of Columbia, where the case was assigned to district judge Randolph D. Moss.

The lawsuit alleges that, in an hour-long piece for its series The Fifth Estate, the CBC broadcast claims by reporters Mark Kelly and Harvey Cashore that the CBC knew to be false, including that WE Charity had exaggerated the number of schoolhouses it had built in Kenya and deceived donors about how their money had been spent. WE Charity accused the CBC of fabricating quotes and using misleading editing to support what WE called a "preconceived narrative."

Joe Patrice of the Above the Law website, which covers legal news, reviewed the details of the lawsuit and called it a "mirror image" of Dominion Voting Systems v. Fox News Network. Dominion Voting Systems, originally a Canadian company, chose to sue Fox News Network in the United States, ultimately settling for $787.5 million. Similarly, WE Charity, whose American operations are incorporated in Williamsville, New York, sued the CBC in the United States, in both instances despite the hurdle of the "actual malice" standard established in New York Times Co. v. Sullivan, which is unique to American law and requires that the defendant either knew that or didn't care if its representations were false. Patrice writes, "The CBC produced segments claiming that the charity misappropriated donor money… it did not."

On May 4, the CBC's attorneys filed a motion to dismiss the case per forum non conveniens, saying that it would be more appropriately heard before a Canadian court. WE Charity replied on June 10, countering that the CBC's allegations had hindered its fundraising efforts in the United States, where many of its donors are located. On June 27, Judge Moss denied the CBC's motion, ruling that the case would proceed in the District Court. Moss rejected the CBC's assertion that travel from Canada to the United States was unduly burdensome, and held that the relative ease of modern electronic discovery and document transfer between jurisdictions made the existence of documentary evidence in Canada a negligible hurdle to litigation in the United States. Patrice suggests that, even ten years prior, the CBC's motion might have succeeded, and sees the decision as an example of how the rise of digital media is revolutionizing the legal profession.

==== Kielburger v. Canadaland ====
In November 2021, Theresa Kielburger, a retired Toronto schoolteacher and mother of Craig and Marc Kielburger, filed a defamation lawsuit against Canadaland Inc. and its proprietor Jesse Brown, seeking $3 million in damages. The lawsuit disputes claims in a Canadaland podcast called "The White Saviors Canadaland. True Crime" which was first aired August 23, 2021.

The central focus of the lawsuit was Canadaland's characterization of a 1997 lawsuit involving her son Craig Kielburger and Saturday Night magazine from the previous year, which resulted in a judicial condemnation and settlement of $319,000 against the magazine. The author of the Saturday Night piece, Isabel Vincent, had claimed that in 1995 Theresa Kielburger deposited $150,000 in donations from the Ontario Federation of Labour into her family bank account. This claim, which both Ms. Kielburger and the Ontario Federation of Labour flatly denied, was presented in Canadaland's podcast, according to the lawsuit, in a manner meant to suggest that Theresa Kielburger had stolen the money. Prior to the airing of the podcast, Canadaland was served a statement of claim by Theresa Kielburger. Ms. Kielburger's lawsuit stated that Canadaland was aware that this claim was false, but repeated it anyway.

Brown accused WE Charity of mounting a public relations campaign against it, telling podcast listeners that “#JesseBrownLies was briefly the number one trending topic in Kenya" and complained that several American media organizations had called Canadaland "fake news". Brown said that he was “confident that this lawsuit will be dismissed."

In May 2024, Ontario Superior Court Justice Edward Morgan denied Brown and Canadaland's bid to dismiss the lawsuit on the basis of Anti-SLAPP legislation, finding instead that Ms. Kielburger's claims had "substantial merit" and setting the case on track to go to trial. Justice Morgan ruled Brown did not give Theresa Kielburger a chance to respond to allegations about her in the podcast. Morgan found no evidence that Brown or Canadaland had any valid defence for the willful omission of relevant information or for what he called a "callous disregard" for Ms. Kielburger's reputation. Morgan found that Canadaland's podcast repeated the earlier libel as a central theme of its podcast after ignoring information provided by her accountant and by the Ontario Federation of Labor, and wrote, “For Canadaland to have left this important point out of its story undermines any factual objectivity that the broadcast may claim." Morgan wrote, "The fact that he was speaking about the plaintiff, and imposing personal pain on the plaintiff by repeating an allegation about her that he was aware had been seriously contested, if not established as entirely false, was seen by him as irrelevant." The judge said Brown's explanation for not contacting Mrs. Kielburger showed, in Brown's eyes, "the Plaintiff's (Mrs. Kielburger's) feelings are worth nothing." The judge went on to say, "The cynicism of Brown's explanation not only accentuates the defamatory sting of his words, but could be considered high handed and oppressive." Justice Morgan said Brown had written proof that the allegations he made about Mrs. Kielburger were false, and the judge ordered the case to move forward to trial.

While ruling that the trial against Brown and Canadaland should go forward, Morgan found that Saturday Night (magazine)'s reporter Isabel Vincent, who was interviewed for the podcast, lacked sufficient involvement to be held liable for Canadaland's behavior.

According to Peter Downard, partner at Fasken, counsel for the plaintiff and one of three members of the Attorney General of Ontario's advisory panel which drafted Ontario's anti-SLAPP legislation, Canadaland's attempt to dismiss Ms. Kielburger's claim is an example of how the legislation he helped to draft, meant to protect whistleblowers against corporate power, is being misused. The law, he explained, was meant to quickly dismiss frivolous claims rather than adjudicate factually and legally complex cases such as Kielburger vs. Canadaland Inc.

Brown and Canadaland claimed three potential valid defences, each of which was rejected by the court. The first was that their statements constituted a "fair and accurate report" of proceedings in the Saturday Night case, but the court found that Canadaland's claims went beyond what was in them.

The second potential defence was that of "responsible communication," meaning that Canadaland had to demonstrate that it exercised due diligence in determining the facts and reported them responsibly. The court found that Canadaland failed this test by not contacting Ms. Kielburger to learn what had actually happened. Lenczner Slaght partner William McDowell commented, "You have to actually do your best to figure out whether the allegation is true or not." When Justice Morgan asked Brown why Canadaland had denied Ms. Kielburger the opportunity to respond to its allegations, Brown responded that he "did not seek comment [from the plaintiff] for the same reason why I didn't seek comment from my own mother: neither of them were involved.”

Finally, Brown and Canadaland claimed that their reporting qualified as "fair comment" on a matter of public interest, which would be protected by law. The court rejected this on the ground that fair comment is a matter of opinion rather than an assertion of fact, and that the evidence suggested that Canadaland's facts were likely untrue.

On June 9 2026, Jesse Brown and Canadaland settled the lawsuit for $775,000. In addition to $110,000 which was ordered following the court's denial of Brown's anti-SLAPP motion., this was one of the largest defamation settlements involving a Canadian media outlet.

Speaking in an open session of the Ontario Superior Court, Brown retracted Canadaland's allegations and apologized to Theresa Kielburger for its false reporting, saying, "This was unfounded. We were wrong to have published it. Canadaland wholly retracts its statement about Ms. Kielburger. We apologize unreservedly to her for the harm caused by our publication of it".

As part of the settlement, Brown's retraction and apology would prominently and permanently appear on Canadaland's website and on every platform where the offending podcast can be found, and an audio of the retraction would be inserted into the podcast itself wherever it appears. Justice William Chalmers approved the settlement, calling it "reasonable and in the best interest of Theresa Kielburger".

Following the hearing, Brown wrote by email, "Theresa Kielburger had nothing to apologize for, and that’s why I apologized to her today".

Theresa Kielburger said, "Jesse Brown broadcast his lies to his audience and beyond. He said what he said in public, without ever calling me for comment in advance. The apology belongs in public too". Kielburger said thaat Brown's false reporting harmed not only herself, but also youths who had raised funds for WE Charity.

WE Charity in a press release said, "It was a foundational allegation on which Canadaland built its broader thesis that the Kielburger family had personally and improperly benefited from WE Charity. That claim is now formally retracted".

=== Government abandons CSSG ===
By July 3, when WE Charity withdrew from the CSSG, over 35,000 students had applied to the program. Through the end of July, the government affirmed that it would continue with the CSSG, but was not accepting new applications and did not say how it would work without WE Charity's participation.

Responding on behalf of the Youth ministry to students who had applied, Danielle Keenan said, "I know that students are disappointed that this program didn't go forward...We are very disappointed as well. Unfortunately, because no one was placed ... we are limited in what we can do on that, but we are looking at the next steps for how we can support students."

Ultimately, the government abandoned the program, having determined that it was not possible for the government to administer it on its own and that no other organization was in the position to do so. Former WE Charity board member Tawfiq Rangwala wrote, "Opposition party politicians and the media seemed not to care about the loss to students, and to my knowledge, none of them publicly reflected on the fact that perhaps WE was the only organization capable of delivering the CSSG after all."

Some opposition New Democrats urged that the $912 million which had been earmarked for the CSSG be redirected to cover students' tuition payments to the schools. New Democrat MP for Edmonton Strathcona, Heather McPherson suggested that the money go instead to the Canada Emergency Student Benefit program, an idea supported by student groups including the Canadian Alliance of Student Associations and the Canadian Federation of Students.

Writing for Education Canada, Professors Karen Mundy of the Ontario Institute for Studies in Education and Kelly Gallagher-Mackay of Wilfrid Laurier University lamented that, amidst a crisis in Canadian education, WE Charity was prevented from fulfilling its commission, with thousands of youth volunteer tutors sidelined due to the appearance of scandal. Forensic accountant, professor and Founding President of the Canadian Academic Accounting Association L.S. Rosen summarized, "A generation of young people lost the opportunity to volunteer and help their country in a time of need."

== Investigation, resignation, and prorogation ==
In addition to the Ethics Committee, a further two governmental committees would be established to investigate the scandal: on Finance and Government Operations. These would continue to run from their inception until August 18, when the government was prorogued, ending all sitting committees. Numerous individuals would be called to testify including the Kielburgers, the Prime Minister, Members of Parliament and public servants. From these committee there would be a number of important outcomes. One major piece of evidence that was uncovered through committee investigation was the revelation, on July 9, that WE Charity had directly paid members of the Prime Minister's family. This was not disclosed by either party, who had in fact stated that the family had not been paid, and had to be discovered as a result of parliamentary investigation.

During testimony on July 22, 2020, Bill Morneau revealed that he had undisclosed travel expenditures from years prior, paid for by WE Charity. Morneau apologized and explained to the committee that he had forgotten about the costs, and had repaid $41,366 that same day. This would haunt Morneau throughout the scandal, as the forgetting of the payment was seen as incongruent to his role as Finance Minister, and the ability to write a cheque for that amount, when many Canadians were applying for COVID-19 benefits in the form of a $2000 monthly emergency payment, was seen as out of touch. In his testimony to the Standing Committee on Finance on July 28, 2020, Marc Kielburger said: "Sir, yes, we're happy to provide that information in terms of especially the reimbursement of travel expenses that was specifically requested."

Another consequence of these committee investigations was the eventual release of a massive quantity of data pertaining to the scandal on August 18, 2020. Included were personal correspondence and inter-governmental memos written by the individuals responsible for the no-bid selection process. Contained within this file were significant disclosures, such as the awareness of the "bestie" relationship which existed between Morneau and the Kielburgers. Moreover, these files strongly suggested that the public service had been pressured by political forces to select WE Charity and that there had been a significant amount of governmental collaboration with WE Charity prior to the creation of the program. A significant portion of the documents had experienced severe redactions however, rendering much of the information incomprehensible. It was later found that these redactions had been done in an inappropriate manner, by individuals who were not authorized to make them.

On August 17, 2020, Bill Morneau announced his resignation as the Finance Minister. The stated reason for his resignation was that it was the right time for a new Finance Minister in light of the evolving pandemic. Many however, saw the timing as related to the ongoing investigations into the WE Scandal and increasing pressure by opposition members for his resignation.

On August 18, 2020, Justin Trudeau officially prorogued parliament. This disbanded all the sitting committees investigating the WE Charity Scandal. This was condemned by the opposition as a tactic to avoid scrutiny, if not an outright coverup as the timing of the prorogation occurred on the same day as the release of the previously mentioned, redacted, 5000-page dossier. Although a significant portion of the documents contained inappropriate levels of redaction, these were unable to be addressed due to the prorogation. In a 2015 campaign manifesto, Justin Trudeau promised to never make use of prorogation to avoid scrutiny; he had repeatedly castigated the practice of prorogation, even attending an anti-prorogation rally in 2010. The prorogation had an additional consequence in that WE Charity, which had explicitly promised to release their side of the documents relating to the scandal weeks earlier in July, then refused to release them, as there were no standing committees to submit them to; WE Charity went on to label attempts to acquire this information as "politicking". Supporters of the prorogation suggested the scandal had no impact on the decision, and pointed to the ongoing COVID-19 crisis as necessitating a cessation in parliamentary debate while the government reset its policy in light of the unprecedented events.

== Events post-prorogation ==
On September 23, 2020, the second session of the 43rd parliament was officially opened with a Speech from the Throne by Governor General Julie Payette.

Efforts to re-establish the investigations tasked with examining the scandal were repeatedly blocked by the Liberal Party through the use of parliamentary procedure and filibuster; this would continue into November.

=== Stillman Foundation reports ===
On October 29, 2020, two reports on WE Charity were published. These reports were funded by the Stillman Foundation, a Minnesota-based US organization which has longstanding ties to WE Charity.

The first report by Matt Torigian, former Deputy Solicitor General for the province of Ontario, concluded there had been no ethical or legal violations in the awarding of the contract; Torigian would go on to broadcast these findings in an opinion column of the Toronto Star. The second report, a forensic audit by accountant Al Rosen, found WE Charity had been in excellent financial health prior to the events of the scandal.

The Toronto Star would issue an editorial on November 6, 2020, apologizing to its readers noting "The Star's failing here was not making clear to readers who was behind the reports." The report was initially branded an independent inquiry; the fact that a major sponsor of WE Charity had commissioned it was omitted entirely. "We fully realized the problem and wanted to correct it precisely because of transparency," said Andrew Phillips, the editorial page editor.

Testimony to Canada's House of Commons Ethics Committee on February 26, 2021, led NDP Member of Parliament, Charlie Angus, to raise concerns as to why the Stillman Foundation would take out expensive full-page ads in major Canadian newspapers and conduct an extensive online campaign to promote the innocence of WE Charity while they are so closely linked to WE Charity's board of directors.

=== Reed Cowan Testimony ===
On Friday February 26, 2021 the House of Commons Ethics Committee heard new testimony from a former WE Charity donor, Reed Cowan, saying that WE Charity had removed a plaque honoring his deceased child. Video evidence showed that a new plaque had been put up to replace the plaque that carried the legacy of Wesley Cowan. WE Charity described this as a misunderstanding by Cowan, noting "WE's schoolhouses in Kenya are built to the same specifications and look similar to one another, so we understand Mr. Cowan's confusion." The charity also noted after Cowan brought the error to WE's attention, it had apologized and installed a second plaque in January 2021. Following Cowan's testimony the House Ethics Committee summoned the Kielburgers to appear the following Monday.

On March 1, 2021, WE Charity released a statement labelling the committee investigation as highly partisan. Furthermore, it declared that, as five of its employees had already been subject to committee testimony, it would not cooperate with any summons.

NDP Member of Parliament Charlie Angus would note that other executives from WE Charity such as Victor Li, the CFO, had also recently refused to voluntarily testify before the House Ethics Committee and had to be ordered to appear on February 19, 2021.

On March 8, 2021, the House Ethics Committee unanimously passed a motion ordering the Kielburgers to testify on, or before, March 12, 2021. A refusal would have seen the motion passed to the House of Commons where Members of Parliament would vote whether to make it a legally binding summons. Later on this day, the Kielburgers agreed to testify, on the condition that the date be pushed back to March 15, 2021, and that they have legal counsel present.

== Findings ==
In a detailed report released May 13, 2021, Ethics Commissioner Mario Dion ruled that WE Charity did not receive any preferential treatment from Prime Minister Justin Trudeau. Dion refuted the claim that WE Charity founders Craig and Marc Kielburger were friends with the Trudeau family, writing: "During the examination, I determined there was no friendship between Mr. Trudeau and the Kielburgers, nor was Mr. Trudeau involved in any discussions with them leading to the decisions." He also ruled that Trudeau's wife Sophie's volunteer work for WE Charity did not constitute a conflict of interest, and that none of Trudeau's relatives could have personally benefited from the government's contracts with WE Charity.

=== The Trudeau III Report ===
The first report, entitled The Trudeau III Report, exonerated the Prime Minister of all charges. The report found that "the appearance of conflict is insufficient to cause a contravention of the Act's substantive rules." In this case, the Ethics Commissioner ruled that there was neither a close relationship, nor fiscally beneficial relationship between the Trudeau Family and WE Charity, nor was the Prime Minister "involved in any discussions with them leading to the decisions."

=== The Morneau II Report ===
The second report, entitled The Morneau II Report, found the Finance Minister had broken three conflict of interest laws. In his ruling, the Ethics Commissioner stated that despite claims to the contrary, there existed a very close personal relationship between Bill Morneau and members of WE Charity. It was also ruled that Morneau "had the opportunity to improperly further WE's private interests", and in the final ruling Dion wrote: "I am of the view that Mr. Morneau gave WE preferential treatment by permitting his ministerial staff to disproportionately assist it when it sought federal funding. ... I therefore found that Mr. Morneau contravened subsection 6(1), section 7 and section 21 of the Act."

== Timeline ==
On April 5, 2020, Prime Minister Justin Trudeau and Former Finance Minister Bill Morneau were recorded in a telephone conversation discussing students, volunteer opportunities, and summer work programs within the context of the ongoing COVID-19 pandemic. The Finance Department was tasked with coming up with a number of options to address these issues.

On April 7, 2020, Small Business Minister Mary Ng and WE Charity Co-founder Craig Kielburger had a telephone call in which WE Charity was asked to submit a pre-established proposal regarding a youth entrepreneurship program. The Finance Department contacted a number of organizations including WE Charity. The date given by the Finance Department for this call was April 7 while WE Charity stated it occurred on April 8. The number of organizations contacted is unknown as it was later discovered that a number of organizations which had been listed as having been contacted, such as the YMCA, were never contacted and "most were never told" about the program.

On April 9, 2020, WE Charity sent an unsolicited proposal to the Government of Canada, specifically the offices of Youth Minister Bardish Chagger and Mary Ng, regarding a program that would seek to award youth monetary grants for the purpose of entrepreneurship. WE Charity has repeatedly stressed that this unsolicited exchange was "distinct and clearly unrelated" to the later proposals.

On April 17, 2020, Chagger spoke with WE co-founder Craig Kielburger to discuss a second proposal by the group to create a youth social entrepreneurship program. Kielburger later sent an email to Chagger thanking her for considering this proposal on April 22, 2020. While it was initially stated that this second proposal was rejected by the government, documents released over the course of the scandal indicated that this proposal was instead repeatedly revised. There was a significant amount of communication between WE Charity and government officials from this date on in order to adapt WE Charity's proposal to ensure it best fit the "ministry's mandate". (See August 13, and August 18)

On April 18, 2020, the Finance Department discussed involving a third-party to administer the program. According to Morneau, "it was the first time he was involved in any talk about WE and the grant program."

On April 19, 2020, Rachel Wernick, a senior government official with Employment and Social Development Canada, made a phone call to Craig Kielburger to discuss youth programs and request a proposal as per his conversation with Chagger on April 17, 2020. During this exchange, the earlier April 9 proposal was raised and it was agreed that it, as well as a second proposal, would be forwarded to the government.

On April 20, 2020, officials in the Finance Department spoke with representatives from WE Charity to discuss a volunteer program. Notes provided by the minister's office said WE Charity would "rework" its proposal to the government to "fully meet the policy objective of national service." On the same day, WE Charity submitted a proposal to the privy council.

Also on April 20, as a result of retroactive disclosures related to the release of documents by the committees investigating the scandal, two key emails from this day are disclosed. The first, sent by assistant deputy finance minister Michelle Kovacevic, read in part: "There has been a lot of back and forth on a student package, as you well know and PMO has been weighing in on a version we shared with our Minister on Saturday." In addition to this, deputy minister of intergovernmental affairs and youth Christiane Fox wrote "I understand WE has been in touch with some of you (or your teams) on a proposal they have for social innovation, picking up from discussions they had with us pre-Covid. I am told they met with Ministers NG, Chagger and others to discuss this + a revised version of the service program. They reached out today as they are also working with DPMO and PMO."

On April 21, 2020, the Finance Department received a proposal from the WE Charity in which it outlined a volunteer program. Also on this day, the Finance Department decided to select a third-party to administer the contract, however it specified that no specific group had been chosen to run it.

On April 22, 2020, the Government of Canada announced a series of measures and future measures to be undertaken to address the impact of the ongoing COVID-19 pandemic on the student population of Canada. Among these, were plans for a program that would seek to compensate students for volunteer work; awarding up to a $5000 bursary for volunteer work.

On May 4, 2020, a final version of the proposal was submitted by WE Charity to Employment and Social Development Canada; this would ultimately become the Canada Student Service Grant program.

On May 5, 2020, Chagger submitted a recommendation to a special cabinet meeting that WE Charity should be selected to administer the program. This was also the date WE Charity began incurring eligible expenses and began work on the program.

On May 22, 2020, cabinet approved WE Charity as the official third-party administrator of the program.

On June 12, 2020, Marc Kielburger was recorded in a zoom call with youth leaders stating that the Prime Minister's Office had contacted WE Charity directly earlier in April to discuss the administration of the program. This statement was declared a fabrication by Kielburger himself, who later clarified "Speaking loosely and enthusiastically, I incorrectly referred to the Prime Minister's Office. In fact, the outreach came from unelected officials at Employment and Social Development Canada."

On June 23, 2020, a contract agreement is signed between the government and WE Charity Foundation. WE Charity Foundation is a separate entity from WE Charity.

On June 25, 2020, the Government of Canada announced the Canada Student Service Grant program through the Prime Minister's Office.

On June 30, 2020, the Government of Canada paid $30,000,000 to WE Charity Foundation to administer the program.

On July 3, 2020, the Ethics Commissioner announced an investigation into Trudeau and the decision to have WE Charity administer the program. It was later revealed that Trudeau's mother Margaret and brother Alexandre received $250,000 and $32,000, respectively, for speaking at WE events between 2016 and 2020. Additionally, Sophie Gregoire Trudeau, the wife of the Prime Minister, was also found to have been involved with the charity prior to the controversy. Two of the daughters of Minister of Finance Bill Morneau were found to have worked in unrelated work for the charity, one in a paid contract position, and the other as an unpaid volunteer; Morneau did not recuse himself from the cabinet decision for the contract. Opposition parties have called for a variety of actions including the release of documents related to the charity and for high-ranking Liberals to appear before Parliamentary committees; the Conservatives asked for an investigation by the RCMP.

On July 9, 2020, Bloc Québécois leader Yves-François Blanchet suggested that Prime Minister Trudeau should step aside "for a few months" during the ethics investigation, and "leave responsibilities to the Deputy Prime Minister" Chrystia Freeland. During a press conference in Ottawa on July 16, 2020, Freeland stated that the Prime Minister has her "complete confidence" and that "all of us, everyone in our government, everyone in cabinet, bears responsibility for this situation."

On July 16, 2020, Minister Chagger told a parliamentary committee that the Trudeau government had been willing to pay WE Charity more than $19.5 million if the Canada Student Service Grant program had been implemented, up to $43.5 million. Chagger went on to say that she was not directed by the prime minister or his staff in suggesting that WE Charity run the program, reiterating that it was a recommendation by the non-partisan civil service. In testimony delivered the same day, Rachel Wernick, the senior assistant deputy minister at Employment and Social Development Canada (ESDC), corroborated this claim saying that she had recommended WE Charity to administer the program, citing its far-reaching connections to youth and the scale and speed at which the program was to be delivered. Wernick further explained that she made her recommendation because the public service was overburdened with responsibilities pertaining to the COVID-19 pandemic, and that while other charities were consulted and considered, the program had to be started quickly, and an open bidding process would have taken months.

On July 21, 2020, Privy Council Clerk Ian Shugart backed up Wernick's statements supporting the Prime Minister's assertions, adding further that there was "no evidence" Trudeau had contact with WE Charity prior to the awarding of the contract, and that the public service and cabinet did not flag any potential conflicts of interest with the program. Shugart went on to say that the public service administering the program would make it less comprehensive than if it had been facilitated through the third-party delivery mechanism originally proposed. Shugart testified that there were misgivings regarding the speed at which government was moving on these programs. Shugart stated:

With respect to how we made decisions and so on, a lot it was virtually, as committees are experiencing. Often at all hours of the day and night given the amount of business and the extent of impacts of the pandemic, people were pressed, people were tired, some public servants were doing their work but knowing it was not being called on, and other public servants were under pretty unrelenting pressure to deliver, the same is true for ministers. With respect to the substance I would say that none of us have been happy with the speed at which analysis had to be undertaken, in fact, we conveyed informally, as did the former government during the financial crisis, to the office of the auditor general. That we anticipated that there would be mistakes.

On July 22, 2020, Minister of Finance Bill Morneau testified at the Standing Committee on Finance that he recently repaid WE Charity $41,366 for expenses incurred by WE for trips his family took to Kenya and Ecuador in 2017. Morneau said the repayment was done after "a thorough review" of his records, and that "this should've been something that we rectified sooner. It was absolutely an error. In looking through my records, I was completely surprised by the situation."

On July 27, 2020, media reports revealed that based on documents shared with the Finance Committee, while the $900 million figure originally reported was a maximum budget for the program, officials had drawn up a plan with WE Charity to spend only about half that amount. Additional documents supported the government's claims that the civil service had evaluated several other nonprofits, including Colleges and Institutes Canada, the United Way and Canadian Red Cross, before recommending WE Charity. Officials at some organizations however said they were never contacted to discuss the program despite indications that they had been. Peter Dinsdale, president and CEO of YMCA Canada, said that "[a]t no point did the government contact YMCA Canada about delivering that program." He added that his organization "absolutely" would have been capable of administering the program." Speaking to CTV News, Dinsdale stated that in light of the ongoing pandemic "It would have been tough given the state of YMCAs across the country, given the impact of COVID — really fighting for basic survival. In normal times, [this] 100 per cent would have been something we could have done." In addition to YMCA Canada, the Canadian Wildlife Federation, United Way, Chantiers Jeunesse, 4H Canada, and the Boys and Girls Clubs of Canada all said the government never contacted them about the CSSG — despite all of the organizations' names appearing on the government's list of groups it considered to deliver the program.

On July 28, 2020, Michelle Douglas, former chair of WE Charity's board, testified before the House of Commons finance committee. Douglas had resigned in March 2020, saying publicly that she did so due to "concerning developments" at the charity. She told the committee that during her tenure as chair, WE Charity's board made specific inquiries and were told that speakers were not being paid for appearing at We Day events. Douglas said she resigned because the organization refused to provide the board with financial documents or access to its chief financial officer, Victor Li, when the board was reviewing mass layoffs at the organization. Asked whether she concurred with the government's assertions that WE Charity was the only organization that could deliver the program at the intended scale and capacity, Douglas said that she could not speculate on that prospect because she had resigned months before the contract was awarded. Responding to concerns that WE Charity benefited from a close relationship with the federal Liberals, she went on to say that the board of directors considered WE Charity to be "non-partisan."

Craig and Marc Kielburger also testified before the finance committee on July 28. The brothers asserted that they did not stand to gain financially from running the program nor did they exploit their ties with the Trudeau family to secure the deal. Asked how "close" their relationship was with the Trudeaus, Craig Kielburger said that neither he nor his brother have ever "socialized" with the prime minister, his wife, his mother or his brother, going on to say that they only invited Sophie Gregoire Trudeau and Margaret Trudeau to take part in wellness programs because of their history of mental health advocacy. They added that elected officials of all political parties at all levels of government had participated in and sponsored WE Charity events, including former Alberta NDP premier Rachel Notley and Laureen Harper, wife of former Conservative prime minister Stephen Harper, who had hosted a reception for them at 24 Sussex Drive in 2013. The brothers also reiterated that it was a member of the civil service who had reached out to them to discuss the program and that they had mistakenly identified the contact as being from the prime minister's office. Craig Kielburger said that he regretted their team having answered the phone call from the civil service and that they did not foresee the escalating consequences that would arise as a result.

On July 30, 2020, Trudeau and his chief of staff, Katie Telford, testified before the finance committee. In his opening statement, Trudeau said that he was not aware that the public service had chosen WE Charity to administer the program until a briefing on May 8. He expected the preexisting Canada Student Service Corps to deliver it but was informed that they would not be able to do so at the scale and capacity required, in the rapid timeframe in which aid programs were being delivered during the pandemic. He again apologized for not recusing himself from cabinet discussions but reiterated that there was "absolutely no preferential treatment," nor direction or influence, from him or his office in selecting WE Charity to administer the Canada Student Service Grant. He went on further to say that the public service told him that the choice was between having WE Charity administer the program or having no program at all. The same day, Liberal MP Wayne Long released a public letter in which he criticized the government's decision-making process and called for full transparency and reform in the PMO and government more broadly to prevent "a systemic failure" in the future.

Also on July 30, 2020, the Public Service Alliance of Canada, a union representing federal workers, issued a statement condemning allegations made on July 21, that the public service was unable to administer the program. In its concluding remarks, the statement read "Finally—and let me conclude—if the government had either used existing programs or asked the public service to set up a new student work and payment plan, it would have avoided the conflict of interest issues that have come to light since the WE Charity announcement, and it would have been able to deliver both pay and work experience to students."

On July 31, 2020, the Government of Ontario announced that it would not be renewing an existing contract the province had with the WE Charity. Although the government did not specify which contract it was cancelling, the Charity was set to administer WE Schools, a $250,000 year-long education program. In a statement to media, the Ministry of Education stated that it "has been directed to not renew the contract with WE and to investigate the expenditures to date."

On August 11, 2020, WE Charity announced through a spokesman that it had returned $22 million of the $30 million it had received earlier on June 30, and was "waiting on the government to accept the remaining $8 million...".

On August 13, 2020, WE Charity registered to lobby the government with 18 individuals on record. As part of this agreement, WE Charity was also allowed to retroactively file its lobbying activities which showed it had engaged with numerous government departments 43 times since the beginning of 2020, with more than half of the communications occurring in or after April.

On August 17, 2020, Bill Morneau resigned as Finance Minister and Member of Parliament for Toronto Centre. This move was widely seen by analysts as a forced resignation designed to protect the Liberals from the unfolding scandal by pinning blame on Morneau.

On August 18, 2020, Prime Minister Trudeau suspended the functioning of the committees by asking the Governor General of Canada Julie Payette to prorogue Parliament until September 23 to present a new Speech from the Throne with an updated vision and priorities in light of the COVID-19 pandemic in Canada. Opposition leader, Andrew Scheer, characterized the prorogation as the government "hiding out" during political controversy. Conservative finance critic, Pierre Poilievre, tweeted that opposition members were demanding access to thousands of pages of documents concerning the controversy before Parliament is prorogued. Trudeau said that the government has released numerous documents that were previously requested by the Opposition, and that opposition members could review them while Parliament is prorogued. Many of these documents however were heavily redacted, and there were questions raised regarding whether what had been censored had been done so appropriately, according to House of Commons Law Clerk Philippe Dufresne, who stated that "public servants went too far in redacting the WE Charity documents released to MPs."

On August 19, 2020, the Canadian Press reported that documents released by the government show that federal public servants recommended the student service grant program be administered by WE Charity. It also reported that documents suggest the government had "nudged" the public service in that direction.

On August 30, 2020, WE Charity, through its lawyer William McDowell, refused the opposition's requests for documents; the disclosure of which had been promised by the Kielburgers during their July 28 testimony. The reasons cited by WE Charity for not releasing the documents were "The committees ceased to exist with the prorogation of Parliament. There is no committee to receive the documents...when there is a new committee, our clients will be pleased to communicate with the clerk of the new committee regarding the production of documents."

On September 4, 2020, WE Charity Foundation, through a Twitter statement, announced it had repaid the remaining balance of the $30 million it had received on June 30, 2020.

On September 9, 2020, WE Charity announced that it was closing its operations in Canada due to political fallout from the controversy and the effects of COVID-19. The organization will establish an endowment to be overseen by a new board of governors.

On October 22, 2020, Queen's University announces that they are ending ties with the WE Charity. "While WE Charity is committed to completing their ongoing sustainable development projects around the world, we decided that it was the best decision to contribute to a new organization as WE Charity is planning to close operations in Canada," The Queen's WE Team has said in a post to their social media.

On October 29, 2020, the Ethics Commissioner discontinued his investigation into Bill Morneau's trips to Kenya and Ecuador that were funded by WE Charity, saying in a letter that he accepted Morneau's contention that he thought he had reimbursed the travel costs. The letter also indicated that Morneau and Trudeau remained under investigation for not recusing from cabinet discussions pertaining to the program. That same day, WE Charity issued a press release expressing satisfaction with the Ethics Commissioner's findings, in addition to announcing the publication of an independent forensic audit of the Canada Student Service Grant and WE Charity's finances conducted by several non-partisan analysts, including forensic accountant Al Rosen and Matt Torigian, the former Deputy Solicitor General for the province of Ontario. According to Torigian, "the CSSG Program was not pre-determined for WE Charity to implement; the government approached WE Charity through the proper channels, requesting that the charity submit a proposal." Parliamentary committees nevertheless continued to press the government on the matter.

On Friday February 26, 2021 the Canadian House of Commons Ethics Committee heard new testimony from a former WE Charity donor, Reed Cowan, saying that WE Charity removed a plaque honoring his dead child. Video evidence shows that a new plaque tied to WE Charity board of director, David Stillman, had been put up to replace the plaque that carried the legacy of Wesley Cowan.

On February 28, 2021, NDP MP Charlie Angus called on the RCMP and CRA to open an investigation into potential financial fraud conducted by WE Charity. Angus called the testimony from donor Reed Cowan "explosive" and demanded a new level of transparency for all parties involved. After being pressured and harassed by WE Charity contacts, donor Reed Cowan issued a personal plea and demand for full transparency into alleged major international financial fraud by WE Charity. Cowan called for the charity to return all funds raised in the name of his deceased son, Wesley, 4, who died in 2006 following an accident. "I demand that every penny paid to WE and Free the Children by the groups I brought there for what feels like a sham experience be immediately reimbursed. Every penny," he said in a video statement posted on YouTube on February 27, 2021. Cowan said he has repeatedly asked for an accounting of where his money went and has never received that information from WE Charity.

On May 13, 2021, the Ethics Commissioner cleared Trudeau of involvement in the We Charity scandal; the Ethics Commissioner found that former Finance Minister Bill Morneau was in violation of the Conflict of Interest Act in relation to awarding We Charity the contract for the Canada Student Emergency Benefit.

== See also ==
- What WE Lost, a book by Tawfiq Rangwala about the event
- The White Saviors, a podcast by Canadaland about the event
- Federal aid during the COVID-19 pandemic in Canada
- List of Canadian political scandals and controversies
