= We Day =

Youth event by We Charity

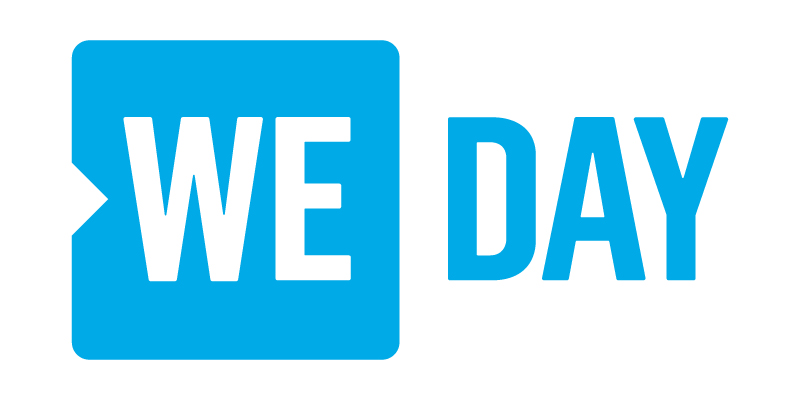

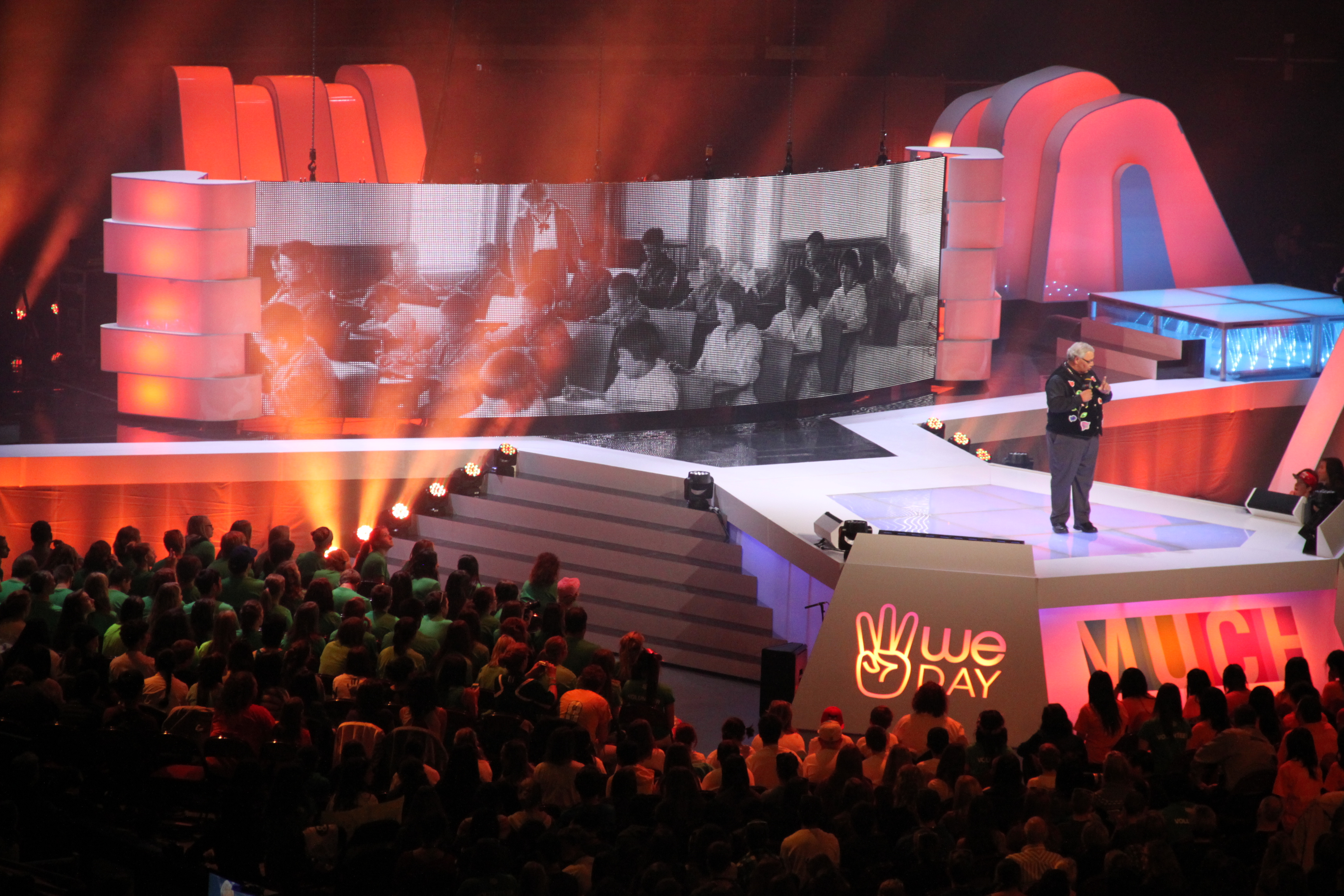
- Frequency: Annual
- Locations: Canada, United States and U.K.
- Years active: 2007–2020
- Inaugurated: 2007
- Most recent: 2020
- Participants: 200,000+
- Organizer: WE Charity
- Website: http://www.we.org/we-day/

We Day (stylized as WE Day) was an annual series of stadium-sized youth empowerment events organized by We Charity (formerly known as Free The Children), a Canadian charity founded by brothers Marc and Craig Kielburger. WE Day events hosted tens of thousands of students and celebrated the effect they have made on local and global issues. Students earned their tickets by participating in the We Schools program, a year-long service learning program that was run by We Charity. Each event featured a lineup of social activists, speakers and musical performances. The event was cancelled in September 2020 with the winding down of Canadian operations of the We Charity, following the WE Charity scandal.

== Background ==
The first WE Day was held in October 2007, at the Ricoh Coliseum in Toronto, Canada. Later, the program expanded to include annual events in 17 cities in Canada, the United States, and the United Kingdom, including Vancouver, London, Chicago and Seattle. The event had featured speeches by global leaders such as Al Gore, Elie Wiesel, Martin Luther King III, Kofi Annan and performances by artists such as Demi Lovato, Selena Gomez, Lilly Singh, Jennifer Hudson and Nelly Furtado.

WE Charity did not charge an admission fee for school groups or individual students to attend WE Days. To earn entry, schools must have pledged to engage in one local and one international effort. WE Charity provided a limited number of tickets to each school and let the schools decide how to choose which students attend. In 2014, WE Days took place in 14 cities worldwide, with more than 200,000 students from 8,000 schools in attendance.

According to the WE Charity website, WE Days were funded through dedicated cash and in-kind corporate donations. No program donations from youth or private individuals were used to fund WE Day.

WE Day and its parent organization have been criticized for its industry partnerships, including to companies with ties to child labor around the world. WE Day has also been criticized for perceived promotion of corporate sponsors and for pressuring students to promote we.org through social media. In his work on "orphanage tourism," Joseph Cheer, an academic at the Center for Tourism Research at Wakayama University, has criticized WE Day for promoting a for-profit volunteerism model encouraging participants to essentially reframe selfishness as altruistic. Due to a 2020 controversy concerning a contract award, We Charity has scrapped WE Day "for the foreseeable future" in a restructuring move.

== WE Schools ==
WE Schools campaigns cover a range of social issues, such as "WE Scare Hunger", in which participants collect canned food items for their local food banks each Halloween, and "WE Are Silent", a vow of silence in which participants stay silent for 24 hours in solidarity with children overseas whose rights are not upheld.

== Events ==
- 2007 at Toronto's Ricoh Coliseum and involved more than 7,500 youth. Speakers at the event included Justin Trudeau, Senator Romeo Dallaire, Irshad Manji, Jessi Cruikshank and Olympic swimmer Mark Tewksbury. Performers included Canadian Idol winner Brian Melo and Hanson. The event was broadcast across Canada via a live webcast produced by MTV.
- 2008: Toronto's Ricoh Coliseum. The event was hosted by Ben Mulroney and Tanya Kim of eTalk. Speakers for the day included Craig Kielburger, Marc Kielburger, Mia Farrow, Justin Trudeau, celebrity designer Nate Berkus, Jessi Cruickshank, the cast of Degrassi: The Next Generation, Ontario Premier Dalton McGuinty and former Prime Minister of Canada John Turner.
- 2009: 16,000 students attended WE Day in Vancouver to hear speakers including the Dalai Lama, Dr. Jane Goodall and Mia Farrow. Performers included K'naan, Sarah McLachlan and Jason Mraz.
- 2010: Events in Toronto, Montreal Quebec and Vancouver, BC.
- 2011: Kitchener, Ontario, Winnipeg, Manitoba and Vancouver, BC.
- 2012:Toronto, Vancouver, Calgary, Alberta, Manitoba, Waterloo, Montreal and Halifax.
- 2013: Minneapolis, with appearances by Nick Jonas, Kevin Jonas, and Joe Jonas. The event was co-chaired by Dean Phillips.
- 2014: Vancouver.
- 2014: Wembley Arena.
- 2015: Rosemont, California. The broadcast had 2.1 million viewers.
- 2015: Toronto.
- 2016: Scotiabank Arena, Toronto.
- 2017: Madison Square Garden, New York.
- 2017 Toronto, held at the Scotiabank Arena. Former Secretary General of the United Nations Ban Ki-moon, actor Gaten Matarazzo, Olympian Andre de Grasse and actor and activist Mia Farrow spoke to the 20,000 youth and educators in attendance.
- 2017: Wembley Arena, London. Appearances from Kate Winslet, Margaret Trudeau, inter alios.
- 2018: United Kingdom, with appearances by Princess Eugenie and Princess Beatrice of York.
- 2018: New York. Held in partnership with UN agencies including UN Women, UNAIDS and UN Global Compact, the event promoted the UN's 17 critical Sustainable Development Goals. Speakers included former president of Colombia Juan Manuel Santos, and human rights advocate Martin Luther King III.
- 2019: Wembley, London, with an audience of 12,000.
- 2019: The Forum in Los Angeles.
- 2019: Allstate Arena, Illinois. Speakers and hosts include: Kareem Abdul-Jabbar, Monique Coleman, Arne Duncan, Laurie Hernandez, Olivia Holt, Rupi Kaur, Craig Kielburger, Marc Kielburger, Kheris Rogers, Kendrick Sampson, Angel Schlotterback, Alexandra Shipp, Margaret Trudeau, Elaine Welteroth and Tom Wilson.
- 2019: Toronto, at the Scotiabank Arena.
- 2019: New York, during the 74th United Nations General Assembly (UNGA).
- 2020: Wembley, London

== Cancellation ==
The event was cancelled in September 2020 with the winding down of Canadian operations of the We Charity, following the WE Charity scandal.
