= ME to WE =

Canadian company related to We Charity

Me to We
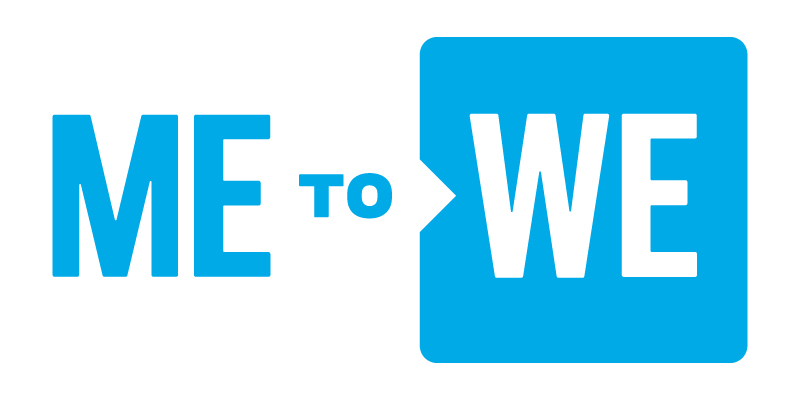
- Company type: For-profit B Corporation
- Industry: Lifestyle and travel
- Founded: Toronto, Ontario, Canada (2008)
- Headquarters: Toronto, Ontario, Canada
- Area served: Worldwide
- Key people: Roxanne Joyal (CEO)
- Website: www.metowe.com

Me to We (stylized as ME to WE) is a Canadian for-profit company selling lifestyle products, leadership training and travel experience. Me to We was founded in 2008 by brothers Craig and Marc Kielburger. ME to WE’s engagements with the Trudeau family came under scrutiny after Justin Trudeau’s government awarded WE Charity a contract to administer the proposed Canada Student Service Grant program.

== History ==
Following the founding of We Charity (formerly known as Free the Children) in 1995, Craig and Marc Kielburger launched a program called "Leaders Today", to offer leadership training to young people and volunteer trips to developing communities served by their charity. In 2008, the Kielburgers launched the for-profit company Me to We, which continued the trips program, and added the sale of socially conscious retail items.

In 2009, half of Me to We's profits were donated to We Charity to support its operating costs, while the remainder was reinvested back into the company.

In 2015, Me to We received certification as a B Corporation.

The company has been criticized for blending corporate promotion with its activist goals. Leadership has also been profiled for their "aggressive responses to criticism", with tight control over media presence and a history of lawsuits.

In October 2018 Jaren Kerr, writing for the Canadian news site Canadaland, argued that ME to WE’s partnership with Walgreens amounted in effect to partnerships with several of Walgreens’ suppliers, including Hershey’s and Kellogg’s, which had been accused of sourcing chocolate and palm oil in part to suppliers which use child labour. 'Kerr’s piece was accompanied by a photograph showing ME to WE’s logo alongside Walgreens’ atop a display rack featuring Hershey’s products. Kerr also criticized ME to WE’s partnership with Unilever, which was likewise accused of having purchased palm oil produced by children.

== Trips ==
Me to We runs volunteer trips to a selection of developing countries where We Charity is active, including: Ecuador, India and Kenya. Trip participants help construct schools or wells.

Some of the organization’s celebrity ambassadors have taken trips with Me to We, including Olivia Holt, Drew Scott, Kardinal Offishall, and Jordan Fisher.

== Artisans ==
Me to We Artisans was founded in 2009 by CEO Roxanne Joyal.

Women employed by Me to We Artisans are paid more than they normally make for their products, and are also provided with training on financial literacy. As a result, many are able to invest part of their income in small businesses and the education of their children.

YouTube personality Lilly Singh designed and promoted a line of beaded bracelets called "#GirlLove Rafikis", as part of her campaign to end "girl on girl hate."

== WE Charity contract controversy ==
In 2020, the company was criticized after it was announced that We Charity would be in charge of distributing $900 million in federal student grants provided by the Government of Canada. This proposal came under fire after CBC reported that Me to We had paid members of Canadian prime minister Justin Trudeau's family for speaking engagements, raising a potential conflict of interest as Trudeau had pushed for the grant program to go ahead. The program was ended before it began, and Trudeau issued an apology for not recusing himself. We Charity's involvement in the grant program was also criticized by several Canadian non-profits and charities.

Based on the Kielburger brothers' testimony at the House of Commons finance committee, over $500,000 were paid by the WE organization to Justin Trudeau's mother, brother and wife. Invited by Liberal MP Annie Koutrakis to address the misconception about the whole story, Craig Kielburger also defended WE Charity and its programs.

Concerns have been raised about the blurred lines between We Charity and Me to We. These blurred lines include both organizations having the same Chief Financial Officer. According to Charity Intelligence, a Canadian registered charity that assesses over 750 Canadian charities, in 2019 We Charity transferred 8% of its revenue to Me to We, a magnitude of revenue transferred from a charity to a related for-profit company that Charity Intelligence's general manager described as "unique" among charities. Charity Intelligence also noted that, as a for profit company privately owned by the Kielburgers, Me to We is not bound by disclosure requirements.

According to Buy Social Canada, a certifying organization, Me to We is the only for-profit company that they are aware of, which is connected to a Canadian charity, but where the charity does not own the for-profit company. Consequently, We Charity is not guaranteed to benefit from profits made by Me to We, despite the close ties between these two organizations.

In response, We Charity claimed that over a 5-year period preceding 2020, Me to We contributed a net of $1.3 million more than it received from We Charity.
