= WE Charity =

Canadian charity

- Formation: 1995
- Type: International charity and educational partner
- Headquarters: Toronto, Ontario, Canada
- Founders: Craig Kielburger; Marc Kielburger
- Website: we.org
- Formerly called: Free the Children

WE Charity (French: Organisme UNIS), formerly known as Free the Children (French: Enfants Entraide), is an international development charity and youth empowerment movement founded in 1995 by human rights advocates Marc and Craig Kielburger. The organization implemented development programs in Asia, Africa and Latin America, focusing on education, water, health, food and economic opportunity. It also runs domestic programming for young people in Canada, the US and UK, promoting corporate-sponsored service learning and active citizenship. Charity Intelligence, a registered Canadian charity that rates over 750 Canadian charities, rates the "demonstrated impact" per dollar of We Charity as "Low" and has issued a "Donor Advisory" due to We Charity replacing most of its board of directors in 2020.

WE Charity is related to other ventures from the Kielburgers, including the for-profit Me to We, which was the title of a 2004 book by Craig and Marc Kielburger, and We Day, a series of large-scale motivational events held in 17 cities throughout the school year.

A scandal arose when the charity was selected by the Canadian federal government in 2020 for a $43.53 million contract to oversee $900 million for the Canada Student Service Grant, but the decision was reversed after ties between the organization and the Trudeau family, including payments to Justin Trudeau's wife, brother, and mother, as well as the family of former Finance Minister Bill Morneau, were called into question.

On 9 September 2020, We Charity announced that it was winding down its operations in Canada and selling its assets to establish an endowment that will help sustain ongoing We Charity projects around the world. The announcement also explains that the existing board of directors, the existing Canadian employees, and the Kielburgers would leave We Charity Canada.

In November 2020, a Wikipedia investigation found the Wikipedia article for the WE Charity was illicitly modified by "paid agents who used deceptive online identities" from Israeli online reputation management service Percepto International. The Chief Operations Officer for WE Charity, Scott Baker, denied involvement with the sockpuppetry and Percepto declined to comment.

In November 2021, CBC News reported that the WE Charity misled donors about the school they built in Kenya. "Far fewer schools were built than were funded by donors, a fact that leaked internal WE documents show was co-ordinated at the highest levels of the organization." WE Charity denied the report. CBC reported that, likely in a "co-ordinated campaign", a large number of groups and individuals wrote letters and emails discouraging them from reporting the story in the months leading up to its publication. The messages largely came from educators and charities, and included a full-page advertisement printed in several newspapers in September that argued that the news report was not in the public interest. On 8 February 2022, WE Charity filed a defamation lawsuit over the report in District of Columbia District Court.

== History ==
Craig Kielburger, age 12, on his first trip to South Asia

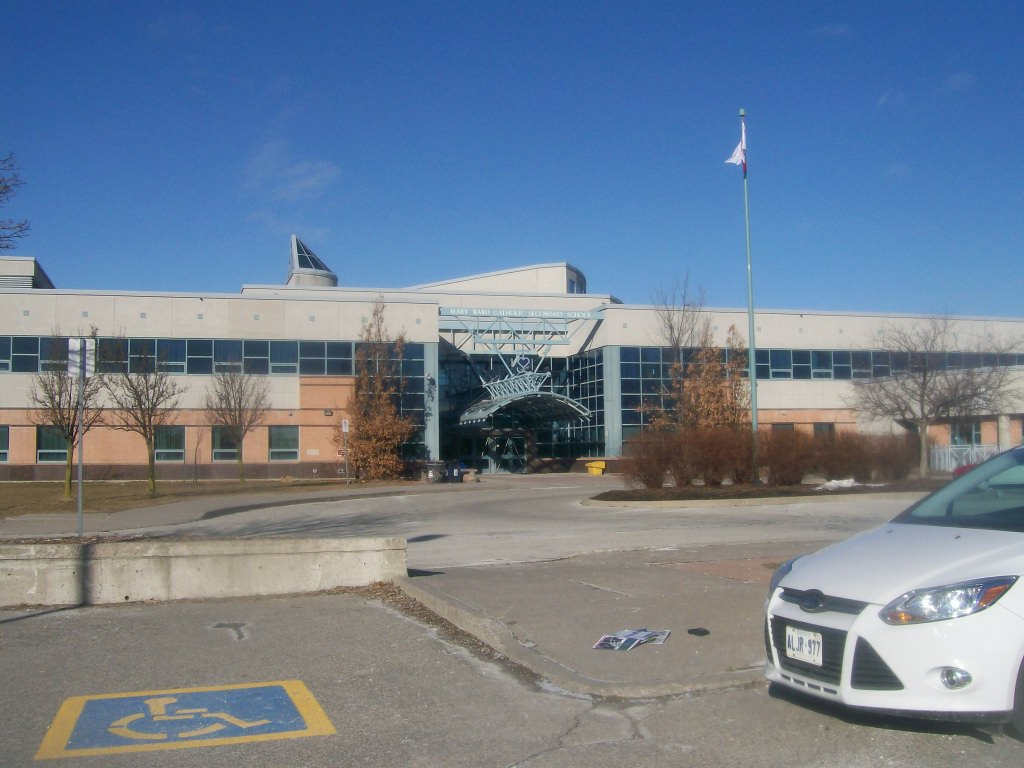
Mary Ward Catholic Secondary School, where Kielburger attended school and the charity's early base of operations

WE Charity (formerly Free the Children) was founded in 1995 by Craig Kielburger when he was 12 years old. Kielburger was reading through the Toronto Star before school one day when he came across an article about the murder of a 12-year-old Pakistani boy named Iqbal Masih, a former child factory worker in Pakistan's carpet trade who had spoken out against child labour and received death threats for his activism. According to Masih's account, he was sold by his parents to a factory at the age of 4 and worked there until he was 10, much of the time shackled to a loom. After the murder of Masih led to an international outcry, Pakistani police said that the killing was not connected to his anti-child labour activism.

One of the Free the Children's first actions was to collect 3,000 signatures on a petition to the prime minister of India, calling for the release of imprisoned child labour activist Kailash Satyarthi. The petition was sent in a shoe box wrapped in brown paper. Satyarthi was eventually released. After he was freed, Satyarthi said, "It was one of the most powerful actions taken on my behalf, and for me, definitely the most memorable." Shortly afterward, Kielburger spoke at the convention of the Ontario Federation of Labour, where union representatives pledged $150,000 for a rehabilitation centre in India. The Bal Ashram centre was built by Satyarthi.

In December 1995, Kielburger embarked on an eight-week tour of South Asia to meet child labourers and hear their stories first-hand. It was on that trip that Kielburger had a meeting with then-Canadian Prime Minister Jean Chrétien, in which Kielburger convinced Chrétien to take a public stand against child slavery. In 1999, he wrote Free the Children, a book detailing his trip to South Asia and the founding of his charity.

Free the Children initially fundraised for organizations that raided factories and freed children from forced labour situations. When it became clear that the rescued children were being resold by their impoverished families, the organization changed its approach and started building schools in Nicaragua, Kenya, Ecuador and India. The organization later evolved an international development model with projects related to education, water, health care, food security and income generation.

In 2007, at age 25, Craig Kielburger was inducted into the Order of Canada. the second-youngest Canadian ever to receive the honour. His brother Marc Kielburger was inducted into the Order of Canada in 2010. Ernst & Young and the Schwab Foundation for Social Entrepreneurship, a sister organization of the World Economic Forum, presented the 2008 Social Entrepreneur Of The Year award in Canada to the Kielburgers for their work with Free the Children.

Free the Children rebranded as WE Charity in 2016. The charity runs domestic programs for young people in Canada, the US and the UK, and international development programs in Africa, Asia and Latin America. In September 2017, the organization moved to a new headquarters in downtown Toronto, named "WE Global Learning Centre". The Centre features a theatre, broadcast studio, and an open concept design.

In March 2020, a significant proportion of the board of directors at WE Charity was abruptly replaced. WE Charity stated that this had been typical conduct, as the contracts had expired naturally, however it was later revealed that the positions were slated to end on August 31, not March.

== Programs ==
=== Domestic ===
Students take part in activities such as food and clothing drives for the homeless, anti-bullying campaigns, and fundraisers to build water projects, and schools in countries where WE Charity works, including Kenya, India, and Ecuador. They also raise money for other organizations and causes, such as children's hospitals, the Terry Fox Run, and women's shelters.

We Charity partners with the Martin Aboriginal Education Initiative to deliver the "We Stand Together" campaign, promoted as strengthening ties between Indigenous and non-Indigenous people in Canada by emphasizing Canadian Indigenous history in classrooms.

In August 2019, the federal government announced that it was giving $3 million to WE Social Entrepreneurs initiative, aiming to create 200 "youth-led enterprises" that address social issues at a community level.

=== International ===
In July 2019, the organization opened its first WE College in Narok County, Kenya. It offered a range of courses to girls of Maasai Mara community. The charity and Me to We formerly carried out activities including school construction and We Day in China. Its purported connection to the Government of China came under scrutiny during the broader government contract scandal, though the organization denied that any relationship existed.

== WE Day ==
WE Charity founders Marc and Craig Kielburger at WE Day 2008

WE Charity holds an annual series of stadium-sized youth empowerment events called "WE Day", bringing together tens of thousands of students and educators as part of the yearlong WE Schools service learning program. WE Day has featured notable speakers, such as Al Gore, Elie Wiesel, Martin Luther King III, Kofi Annan, Prince Harry and Meghan Markle and performers, such as Demi Lovato, Selena Gomez, Lilly Singh, Jennifer Hudson, Liam Payne, Iskra Lawrence, and Naomi Campbell. Tickets are not purchased, but are instead earned by students through service in a local or a global cause. The first WE Day was staged in Toronto in October 2007. The program has since expanded into 17 cities, including London, Chicago, Seattle, and Los Angeles. As of 2020, WE Day has been scrapped "for the foreseeable future".

== Me to We ==
In 2004, Craig and Marc Kielburger published Me to We: Finding Meaning in a Material World. The book included contributions from Oprah Winfrey, Archbishop Desmond Tutu and Dr. Jane Goodall, and outlined the tenets of the "ME to WE" philosophy, including the importance of community and the idea of service as a path to happiness.

In 2008, Kielburger co-founded ME to WE, a social enterprise that offers socially conscious products, leadership training and travel experiences. ME to WE donates a minimum half of its profits to its partner organization WE Charity, to support its operating costs and international development work and invests the other half back into growing the enterprise.

== Governance and financials ==
WE Charity is governed by separate Boards of Directors in Canada, the US and UK. The Canadian Board Chairwoman was Michelle Douglas, a Canadian human rights activist. She resigned in March 2020, at the same time as many other board members. Douglas has said publicly since that she resigned because of "concerning developments" at the charity. Board members are drawn from government, academia, business, media and charitable sectors.

Concerns have been raised about the blurred lines between We Charity and Me to We. These blurred lines include both organizations having the same Chief Financial Officer. According to Charity Intelligence, in 2019, We Charity transferred 7% of its revenue to Me to We, a magnitude of revenue transferred from a charity to a related for-profit company that Charity Intelligence has not seen with any other charities. We Charity's response to these concerns is that over a 5-year period preceding 2020, even after excluding the value of services and in kind contributions, Me to We contributed a net of $1.3 million more than it received from We Charity.

== Education and WE College ==
In 1998, WE Charity began funding the construction of primary schools in Kenya. In 2003, the organization began partnerships with the Maasai and Kipsigis communities to build schools, hospitals and libraries as well as water, sanitation and agricultural irrigation projects. WE Charity's Kisaruni All Girls High School is ranked among the top high schools in Narok County.

In 2017, WE College in Maasai Mara, a post-secondary institution in Enelerai, South Narok County, Kenya, opened its School of Nursing, followed by schools of Clinical Medicine and Entrepreneurial Agriculture, with the intention of later adding schools of Public Health, Technical Studies, Business and Technology and Education. This was the first nursing training program in the region. Nursing was considered especially important in Kenya, where the ratio of nurses to population stood around 25 to 10,000, whereas the Kenyan government recommended 83 to 10,000. As of 2019, all of the nursing school's students were women, despite being open to both sexes.

In July 2019, Kenyan First Lady Margaret Kenyatta presided over the official opening ceremony of WE College, where she emphasized the importance of educating girls and women. Also present and speaking were Narok Governor Samuel Tunai, Kenya's Chief Administrative Secretary for Interior Patrick Ole Ntutu and Principal Secretary for Department of Vocational and Technical Education Kevit Desai as well as Canadian High Commissioner to Kenya Lisa Stadelbauer, former Canadian First Lady Margaret Trudeau and former Canadian Prime Minister Kim Campbell.

Kenyatta also toured the Baraka Hospital, which is likewise located in Enelarai and includes a level IV trauma center. In 2015, the Narok County District Quality Assurance Team had voted WE Charity's Baraka Hospital Maternity Wing the best in the country.

In December 2019, WE Charity hosted Selena Gomez, who had been a supporter of the charity for over six years, along with her friend Raquelle Stevens for ten days in Kenya, While in Kenya, Gomez met students at WE's Kisaruni girls' high school and at WE College, and learned beading with local practitioners.

In 2017, WE charity opened the Agricultural Learning Center in Ecuador's Chone village, where students learn to grow produce in the school's garden and sell it to local markets as entrepreneurs. WE's food security strategy includes introducing teachers and students to crops not commonly grown in the immediate region, including tomatoes, cucumbers, peppers, watermelon and pineapple to supplement the locally more typical yucca, cacao, coffee and plantains.

== Work culture ==
Some former employees and volunteers of We Charity have criticized the way they were treated at the organization. Former employees have been prevented from speaking about the organization because of non-disclosure agreements and described being in a culture of fear when challenging internal decisions. In June 2020, Amanda Maitland, a former We Charity employee, said a speech she wrote for a We Schools tour in 2019 about her experiences as a black woman was edited without her approval by a group of mostly white staff members. Maitland said when she tried a few months later to speak up a staff meeting about problems within the organization, she was "aggressively" shut down by Marc Kielburger. In July 2020, Marc and Craig Kielburger apologized "unreservedly" to Maitland on their personal Instagram accounts. The Kielburgers said the editing of Maitland's speech "simply should not have happened." A petition that circulated in July 2020 called on We Charity to take specific anti-racist measures. WE Charity said in a statement to CBC News that it "stands firmly for inclusion, diversity and the equitable, open treatment of all."

== Government contracts scandal ==
In 2020, the federal cabinet of Justin Trudeau selected WE to administer a payment program for the Canada Student Service Grant program, a $900 million volunteer program, for a contract worth $43.53 million. The decision raised questions about the charity's ties to the Trudeau family and potential conflicts of interest and why the federal public service could not administer the funds as part of their regular mandate. Prime Minister Trudeau defended the government's initial decision to have WE Charity administer the program, saying that the organization's networks across the country made it the right choice and WE Charity itself would not profit from the contract.

On July 3, Liberal Minister of Diversity and Inclusion and Youth, Bardish Chagger, announced that WE Charity would no longer be administering the Canada Student Service Grant program. That same day, the Ethics Commissioner announced an investigation into Trudeau and the decision to have WE Charity administer the summer student grant program. Later it was revealed that Trudeau's mother Margaret and brother Alexandre received $250,000 and $32,000, respectively, for speaking at WE events between 2016 and 2020. Two of the daughters of Minister of Finance Bill Morneau were also found to have worked in unrelated work for the charity, one in a paid contract position, and the other as an unpaid volunteer; Morneau did not recuse himself from the cabinet decision for the contract.

Opposition parties have called for a variety of actions including the release of documents related to the charity and for high-ranking Liberals to appear before Parliamentary committees; the Conservatives asked for an investigation by the RCMP. Since then, Michelle Douglas, the former chair of We Charity's board, the Kielburger brothers, Trudeau, and his chief of staff Katie Telford have all been scheduled to testify before the Finance Committee. On July 31, 2020, the Government of Ontario announced that it would not be renewing an unspecified existing contract the province had with the WE Charity.

In a detailed report released May 13, 2021, Ethics Commissioner Mario Dion ruled that WE Charity did not receive any preferential treatment from Prime Minister Justin Trudeau. Dion refuted the claim that WE Charity founders Craig and Marc Kielburger were friends with the Trudeau family, writing, "During the examination, I determined there was no friendship between Mr. Trudeau and the Kielburgers, nor was Mr. Trudeau involved in any discussions with them leading to the decisions." He also ruled that Trudeau's wife Sophie's volunteer work for WE Charity did not constitute a conflict of interest, and that none of Trudeau's relatives could have personally benefited from the government's contracts with WE Charity.

== WE Charity v. CBC ==
On February 8 2022, WE Charity's New York-based affiliate filed a lawsuit against the Canadian Broadcasting Corporation (CBC) for defamation. The 230-page complaint was filed in the United States District Court for the District of Columbia, where the case was assigned to district judge Randolph D. Moss.

The lawsuit alleges that, in an hour-long piece for its series The Fifth Estate, the CBC broadcast claims by reporters Mark Kelly and Harvey Cashore that the CBC knew to be false, including that WE Charity had exaggerated the number of schoolhouses it had built in Kenya and deceived donors about how their money had been spent. WE Charity accused the CBC of fabricating quotes and using misleading editing to support what WE called a "preconceived narrative."

Joe Patrice of the Above the Law website, which covers legal news, reviewed the details of the lawsuit and called it a "mirror image" of Dominion Voting Systems v. Fox News Network. Dominion Voting Systems, originally a Canadian company, chose to sue Fox News Network in the United States, ultimately settling for $787.5 million. Similarly, WE Charity, whose American operations are incorporated in Williamsville, New York, sued the CBC in the United States, in both instances despite the hurdle of the "actual malice" standard established in New York Times Co. v. Sullivan, which is unique to American law and requires that the defendant either knew that or didn't care if its representations were false. Patrice writes, "The CBC produced segments claiming that the charity misappropriated donor money… it did not."

On May 4, the CBC's attorneys filed a motion to dismiss the case per forum non conveniens, saying that it would be more appropriately heard before a Canadian court. WE Charity replied on June 10, countering that the CBC's allegations had hindered its fundraising efforts in the United States, where many of its donors are located. On June 27, Judge Moss denied the CBC's motion, ruling that the case would proceed in the District Court. Moss rejected the CBC's assertion that travel from Canada to the United States was unduly burdensome, and held that the relative ease of modern electronic discovery and document transfer between jurisdictions made the existence of documentary evidence in Canada a negligible hurdle to litigation in the United States. Patrice suggests that, even ten years prior, the CBC's motion might have succeeded, and sees the decision as an example of how the rise of digital media is revolutionizing the legal profession.

== Kielburger v. Canadaland ==
In November 2021, Theresa Kielburger, a retired Toronto schoolteacher and mother of Craig and Marc Kielburger, filed a defamation lawsuit against Canadaland Inc. and its proprietor Jesse Brown, seeking $3 million in damages. The lawsuit disputes claims in a Canadaland podcast called "The White Saviors Canadaland. True Crime" which was first aired August 23, 2021.

The central focus of the lawsuit was Canadaland's characterization of a 1997 lawsuit involving her son Craig Kielburger and Saturday Night magazine from the previous year, which resulted in a judicial condemnation and settlement of $319,000 against the magazine. The author of the Saturday Night piece, Isabel Vincent, had claimed that in 1995 Theresa Kielburger deposited $150,000 in donations from the Ontario Federation of Labour into her family bank account. This claim, which both Ms. Kielburger and the Ontario Federation of Labour flatly denied, was presented in Canadaland's podcast, according to the lawsuit, in a manner meant to suggest that Theresa Kielburger had stolen the money. Prior to the airing of the podcast, Canadaland was served a statement of claim by Theresa Kielburger. Ms. Kielburger's lawsuit stated that Canadaland was aware that this claim was false, but repeated it anyway.

Brown accused WE Charity of mounting a public relations campaign against it, telling podcast listeners that “#JesseBrownLies was briefly the number one trending topic in Kenya" and complained that several American media organizations had called Canadaland "fake news". Brown said that he was “confident that this lawsuit will be dismissed."

In May 2024, Ontario Superior Court Justice Edward Morgan denied Brown and Canadaland's bid to dismiss the lawsuit on the basis of Anti-SLAPP legislation, finding instead that Ms. Kielburger's claims had "substantial merit" and setting the case on track to go to trial. Justice Morgan ruled Brown did not give Theresa Kielburger a chance to respond to allegations about her in the podcast. Morgan found no evidence that Brown or Canadaland had any valid defence for the willful omission of relevant information or for what he called a "callous disregard" for Ms. Kielburger's reputation. Morgan found that Canadaland's podcast repeated the earlier libel as a central theme of its podcast after ignoring information provided by her accountant and by the Ontario Federation of Labor, and wrote, “For Canadaland to have left this important point out of its story undermines any factual objectivity that the broadcast may claim." Morgan wrote, "The fact that he was speaking about the plaintiff, and imposing personal pain on the plaintiff by repeating an allegation about her that he was aware had been seriously contested, if not established as entirely false, was seen by him as irrelevant." The judge said Brown's explanation for not contacting Mrs. Kielburger showed, in Brown's eyes, "the Plaintiff's (Mrs. Kielburger's) feelings are worth nothing." The judge went on to say, "The cynicism of Brown's explanation not only accentuates the defamatory sting of his words, but could be considered high handed and oppressive." Justice Morgan said Brown had written proof that the allegations he made about Mrs. Kielburger were false, and the judge ordered the case to move forward to trial.

While ruling that the trial against Brown and Canadaland should go forward, Morgan found that Saturday Night (magazine)'s reporter Isabel Vincent, who was interviewed for the podcast, lacked sufficient involvement to be held liable for Canadaland's behavior.

According to Peter Downard, partner at Fasken, counsel for the plaintiff and one of three members of the Attorney General of Ontario's advisory panel which drafted Ontario's anti-SLAPP legislation, Canadaland's attempt to dismiss Ms. Kielburger's claim is an example of how the legislation he helped to draft, meant to protect whistleblowers against corporate power, is being misused. The law, he explained, was meant to quickly dismiss frivolous claims rather than adjudicate factually and legally complex cases such as Kielburger vs. Canadaland Inc.

Brown and Canadaland claimed three potential valid defences, each of which was rejected by the court. The first was that their statements constituted a "fair and accurate report" of proceedings in the Saturday Night case, but the court found that Canadaland's claims went beyond what was in them.

The second potential defence was that of "responsible communication," meaning that Canadaland had to demonstrate that it exercised due diligence in determining the facts and reported them responsibly. The court found that Canadaland failed this test by not contacting Ms. Kielburger to learn what had actually happened. Lenczner Slaght partner William McDowell commented, "You have to actually do your best to figure out whether the allegation is true or not." When Justice Morgan asked Brown why Canadaland had denied Ms. Kielburger the opportunity to respond to its allegations, Brown responded that he "did not seek comment [from the plaintiff] for the same reason why I didn't seek comment from my own mother: neither of them were involved.”

Finally, Brown and Canadaland claimed that their reporting qualified as "fair comment" on a matter of public interest, which would be protected by law. The court rejected this on the ground that fair comment is a matter of opinion rather than an assertion of fact, and that the evidence suggested that Canadaland's facts were likely untrue.

On June 9 2026, Jesse Brown and Canadaland settled the lawsuit for $775,000. In addition to $110,000 which was ordered following the court's denial of Brown's anti-SLAPP motion., this was one of the largest defamation settlements involving a Canadian media outlet.

Speaking in an open session of the Ontario Superior Court, Brown retracted Canadaland's allegations and apologized to Theresa Kielburger for its false reporting, saying, "This was unfounded. We were wrong to have published it. Canadaland wholly retracts its statement about Ms. Kielburger. We apologize unreservedly to her for the harm caused by our publication of it".

As part of the settlement, Brown's retraction and apology would prominently and permanently appear on Canadaland's website and on every platform where the offending podcast can be found, and an audio of the retraction would be inserted into the podcast itself wherever it appears. Justice William Chalmers approved the settlement, calling it "reasonable and in the best interest of Theresa Kielburger".

Following the hearing, Brown wrote by email, "Theresa Kielburger had nothing to apologize for, and that’s why I apologized to her today".

Theresa Kielburger said, "Jesse Brown broadcast his lies to his audience and beyond. He said what he said in public, without ever calling me for comment in advance. The apology belongs in public too". Kielburger said thaat Brown's false reporting harmed not only herself, but also youths who had raised funds for WE Charity.

WE Charity in a press release said, "It was a foundational allegation on which Canadaland built its broader thesis that the Kielburger family had personally and improperly benefited from WE Charity. That claim is now formally retracted".
