= Craig Kielburger =

Canadian human rights activist (born 1982)

Craig Kielburger CM MSM OMC
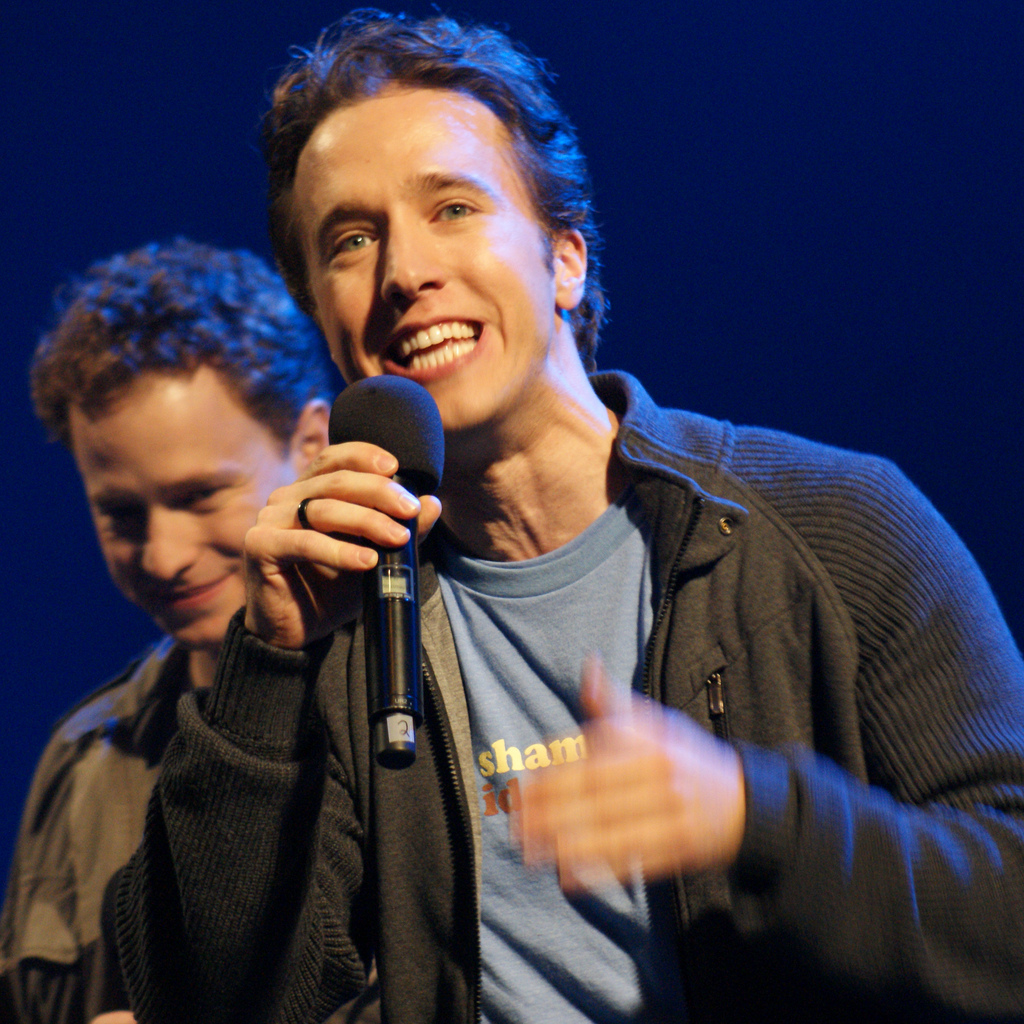
- Kielburger in 2011
- Born: December 17, 1982 (age 43); Thornhill, Ontario, Canada
- Education: Trinity College, Toronto (BA); York University (MBA)
- Occupation: Social entrepreneur
- Known for: Co-founder of WE Charity and Me to We
- Spouse: Leysa Cerswell Kielburger
- Relatives: Marc Kielburger (brother)
- Website: www.craigkielburger.com

Craig Kielburger CM MSM OMC (born December 17, 1982) is a Canadian human rights activist and social entrepreneur. He is the co-founder, with his brother Marc Kielburger, of the WE Charity, as well as We Day and the independent, social enterprise Me to We. On April 11, 2008, Kielburger was named a member of the Order of Canada.

== Early life and education ==
Craig Kielburger was born on December 17, 1982, in Thornhill, Ontario to Fred and Theresa Kielburger, two teachers and real estate investors.

He attended Blessed Scalabrini Catholic School, in Thornhill, and Mary Ward Catholic Secondary School in Scarborough, Toronto. In 2002, he entered the Peace and Conflict Studies program at the University of Toronto. In 2009, he completed the Kellogg-Schulich Executive MBA program at York University.

== Activism ==
=== WE Charity ===
In 1995, when Kielburger was 12 years old, he saw a headline in the Toronto Star about a Pakistani child labourer named Iqbal Masih who was killed for speaking out against the carpet industry. In December 1995, Kielburger travelled to Asia with Alam Rahman, a family friend from Bangladesh to see the condition of child labourers. While there, he met with then-prime minister of Canada, Jean Chrétien. Kielburger advocated for Canadian action on the issue of child labour, making headlines across Canada and internationally.

Upon his return, Kielburger was featured on 60 Minutes and The Oprah Winfrey Show. His trip was documented in the Judy Jackson documentary It Takes a Child. In 1999, Kielburger collaborated with novelist Kevin Major to write Free the Children, a book detailing his trip and the founding of Free The Children.

Kielburger's parents supported the early stages of the organization, which was initially headquartered in the Kielburger family home. The group collected 3,000 signatures for a petition to the prime minister of India calling for the release of imprisoned child labour activist Kailash Satyarthi. Satyarthi won the Nobel Peace Prize in 2014. On his eventual release, Satyarthi said, "It was one of the most powerful actions taken on my behalf, and for me, definitely the most memorable".

Kielburger's charity fundraised for organizations that raided factories and freed children from forced labour situations. When it became clear that the rescued children were being resold by their impoverished families, Free The Children began to fund school building projects in Nicaragua, Kenya, Ecuador and India. It later focused on education, water, health care, food security and income generation.

In 2016, Free The Children changed its name to WE Charity. The organization implements domestic programs for young people in Canada, the US and the UK, and international development programs in communities in Africa, Asia and Latin America. In July 2019, Kielburger opened an educational facility WE College in Narok County, Kenya with former Canadian prime minister Kim Campbell, Margaret Trudeau and Kenyan First Lady Margaret Kenyatta attending the event. In August 2019, Bill Morneau, the Canadian finance minister and Craig Kielburger announced that the federal government would be donating $3 million to the WE Social Entrepreneurs initiative.

On 9 September 2020, Craig and his brother Marc announced that they were winding down WE Charity's operations in Canada and establishing an endowment that will sustain ongoing WE Charity projects around the world. The brothers attributed the decision to the financial condition of WE Charity caused by the COVID-19 pandemic and the political controversy over the awarding of contracts from the Canadian government. Craig said that the decision to close WE Charity would preserve life-saving projects, including hospitals, boarding schools, colleges for women, and food security programs.

=== Me to We ===
In 2004, Craig and Marc Kielburger published Me to We: Finding Meaning in a Material World. The book included contributions from Oprah Winfrey, Archbishop Desmond Tutu and Dr. Jane Goodall, and outlined the tenets of the “ME to WE” philosophy, including the importance of community and the idea of service as a path to happiness.

In 2008, Kielburger co-founded ME to WE, a social enterprise that offers socially conscious products, leadership training and travel experiences. ME to WE donates a minimum half of its profits to its partner organization WE Charity, to support its operating costs and international development work and invests the other half back into growing the enterprise.

=== Realizing the Dream ===
On January 15, 2024, Martin Luther King's 95th birthday, the National Football League announced a five-year commitment to Realizing the Dream, a partnership between the Martin Luther King III Foundation and a charity founded by the Kielburgers called Legacy+, in which the NFL said that all of its teams would be participating. The initiative calls youth, teachers and communities across the United States and the world to perform 100 million hours of community service by Martin Luther King's 100th birthday in 2029.

That night, King's oldest son and former Southern Christian Leadership Conference president Martin Luther King III appeared at Tampa's Raymond James Stadium for the NFC Wild Card Game, where he and his family stood at midfield for the pregame coin toss. Before the coin toss, King III was interviewed about the project, with Tampa mayor Jane Castor and former mayor Pam Iorio in attendance, where he said, "Certainly (the elder King) wanted to eradicate what he defined were the triple evils: poverty, racism and violence. But he also believed in civility and being together, and we could disagree without being disagreeable. Unfortunately, our nation is at a divided point. That’s sort of why football games and championships are so important, because they bring people together, from every walk of life."

Several weeks later, on February 5, the Cincinnati Reds announced that it, too, had joined the Realizing the Dream initiative, with Martin Luther King III appearing at the Cincinnati's Great American Ball Park for the occasion. On January 13, 2025, the National Basketball Association team Washington Wizards and Monumental Sports & Entertainment Foundation announced that they, too, would join the partnership with Realizing the Dream.

Kielburger and his brother Marc wrote a book with Martin Luther King III and his wife Arndrea Waters King titled What Is My Legacy?: Realizing a New Dream of Connection, Love and Fulfillment. Contributors to the book include the Dalai Lama, Julia Roberts, Yara Shahidi, Jay Shetty, Al Sharpton and Sanjay Gupta. The book is scheduled for release on January 14, 2025, the day before what would have been Martin Luther King Jr.'s 96th birthday. Excerpts from the book were republished in People magazine.

On January 13, 2025, iHeartMedia announced that it had partnered with Legacy+ and The Martin Luther King III Foundation to produce a podcast series called My Legacy. The first episode of My Legacy aired on January 20, Martin Luther King Jr. Day, with a new podcast scheduled to appear each Monday thereafter. Hosted by Martin Luther King III, Arndrea Waters King and Legacy+ founders Craig Kielburger and Marc Kielburger, the podcast is to feature guests including Billy Porter, David Oyelowo, Mel Robbins and Martin Sheen joined by their family members and friends to discuss their lives.

== Canada Student Service Grant program ==
Craig Kielburger and fellow WE Charity co-founder Marc Kielburger announced they were pulling out of the $912 million Canada Student Service Grant program because of the controversy the awarding of the contract raised. The contract with the We Charity had raised accusations of favoritism, since the government was outsourcing a massive federal aid program to a private organization with close ties to the prime minister. Following this, Opposition members of Parliament (MPs) asked the auditor general and the procurement ombudsman to investigate the contract, and other contracts awarded to We Charity over the years.

== Public life ==
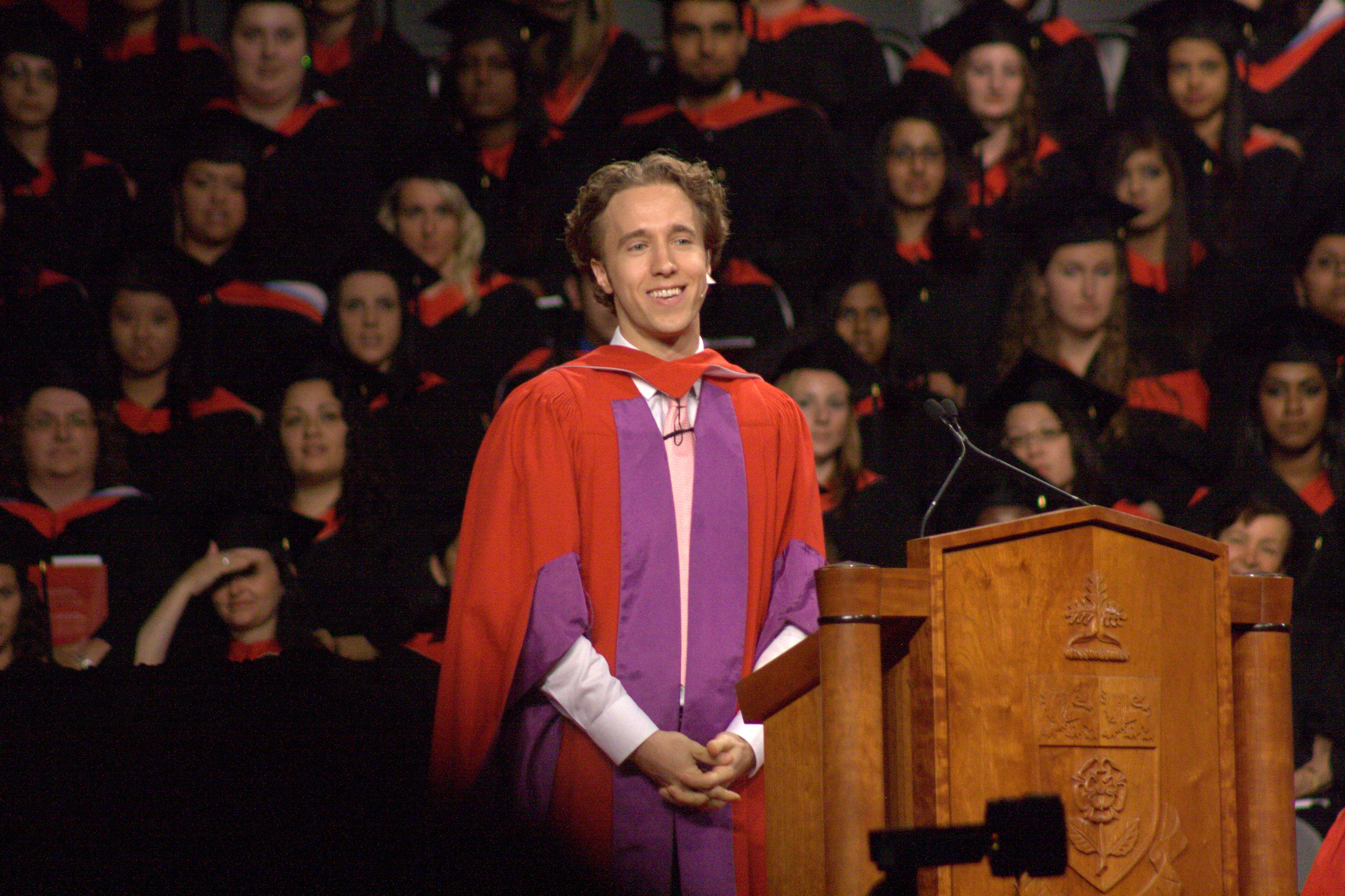
Craig Kielburger addressing candidates at the 2013 York University Convocation

Kielburger contributes a regular column called "Global Voices" for the Vancouver Sun, Halifax Chronicle Herald, Edmonton Journal, Victoria Times Colonist, Waterloo Region Record, Winnipeg Free Press, Huffington Post and Huffington Post Canada online.

He is the author of 12 books, several co-written with his brother Marc Kielburger Their latest publication (2018) is WEconomy: You Can Find Meaning, Make a Living, and Change the World, co-authored with Holly Branson, daughter of business magnate Richard Branson

In 2000, Kielburger was awarded $319,000 in damages as settlement for a libel suit launched against the now-defunct Saturday Night magazine. The settlement covered Kielburger's legal costs and the remainder was used to set up a trust fund for Free The Children.

In 2007, Kielburger was inducted into the Order of Canada.

In 2012, Craig Kielburger Secondary School opened in Milton, Ontario. The school was named Kielburger after a campaign by students.

In 2013, Kielburger was inducted into Canada's Walk of Fame, alongside his brother Marc Kielburger.

He participated in the 2015 edition of Canada Reads, advocating for Thomas King's book The Inconvenient Indian.

The Pakistani female education activist Malala Yousafzai comments that she has been influenced by Kielburger in the development of her own ambitions: "I got inspired because at the age of twelve he started this organisation [Free the Children] ... and now his work has spread all over the world".

== Honours ==
=== Awards ===
- Reebok Human Rights Award
- World Economic Forum Global Leaders of Tomorrow Award, 1998
- Nelson Mandela Human Rights Award, 2003
- Action Canada Fellowship (2005-2006)
- EY & Schwab Foundation for Social Entrepreneurship Social Entrepreneur of the Year Award (2008)

=== Orders, decorations and medals ===
- Meritorious Service Medal, Civil Division, 1997
- Ontario Medal for Good Citizenship, 1998
- Member of the Order of Canada, 2007
- Queen Elizabeth II Diamond Jubilee Medal, 2012

=== Commonwealth honours ===
Country	Date	Appointment	Post-nominal letters
Canada	2007 – Present	Member of the Order of Canada	CM
Canada	1997 – Present	Meritorious Service Medal (Civil Division)	MSM
Canada	1998 – Present	Ontario Medal for Good Citizenship	OMC
Canada	February 6, 2012 – Present	Queen Elizabeth II Diamond Jubilee Medal (Canadian Version)	

=== Honorary degrees ===
Location	Date	School	Degree	Gave Commencement Address
Ontario	June 9, 2005	Nipissing University	Doctor of Education (D.Ed.)	
Ontario	June 2007	University of Guelph	Doctor of Laws (LL.D)	
Ontario	Fall 2009	University of Windsor	Doctor of Humanities (DHL)	
Ontario	June 3, 2011	Trent University	Doctor of Laws (LL.D)	
Ontario	June 8, 2011	University of Toronto	Doctor of Laws (LL.D)	
Ontario	June 14, 2011	University of Western Ontario	Doctor of Laws (LL.D)	
Ontario	June 2011	Wilfrid Laurier University	Doctor of Letters (D.Litt.)	
Ontario	2012	Carleton University	Doctor of Laws (LL.D)	
British Columbia	May 31, 2012	Kwantlen Polytechnic University	Doctor of Laws (LL.D)	
Quebec	June 2012	Concordia University	Doctor of Laws (LL.D)	
Ontario	Spring 2013	York University	Doctor of Laws (LL.D)	Yes
British Columbia	2014	Thompson Rivers University	Doctor of Letters (D.Litt.)	
Ontario	2018	University of Ontario Institute of Technology	Doctor of Laws (LL.D)	

== Bibliography ==
- Free the Children (1998)
- Me to We (with Marc Kielburger, 2004)
- Take Action (with Marc Kielburger, 2002)
- Take More Action (with Marc Kielburger, 2008)
- Making of an Activist (with Marc Kielburger, 2007)
- Global Voices: Volume 1 (with Marc Kielburger, 2010)
- Lessons From A Street Kid (2011)
- My Grandma Follows Me on Twitter (with Marc Kielburger, 2012)
- WEconomy (with Marc Kielburger and Holly Branson, 2018)
