= SNC-Lavalin affair =

2019 political controversy in Canada

The SNC-Lavalin affair (French: Affaire SNC-Lavalin) was a political scandal involving attempted political interference with the justice system by the Prime Minister of Canada, Justin Trudeau, and the Prime Minister's Office (PMO). Mario Dion, the Ethics Commissioner of the Canadian Parliament, found that Trudeau improperly influenced then Minister of Justice and Attorney General Jody Wilson-Raybould to intervene in an ongoing criminal case against Quebec-based construction company SNC-Lavalin (subsequently rebranded AtkinsRéalis in 2023) by offering a deferred prosecution agreement.

The affair became public when The Globe and Mail published an article uncovering the allegations on 7 February 2019, shortly after Wilson-Raybould had been shuffled to another cabinet position as Minister of Veterans Affairs. On 11 February, Ethics Commissioner Dion announced he would investigate the allegations. Wilson-Raybould resigned from cabinet the next day. This was followed by the resignation of Gerald Butts, the Principal Secretary to Trudeau, on February 18. This was then followed by the resignation of fellow Liberal cabinet minister Jane Philpott on March 5, over the government's handling of the affair. The House of Commons' Justice Committee held three hearings into the affair. Wilson-Raybould, Butts, and Michael Wernick, Clerk of the Privy Council testified before the committee. Wilson-Raybould said there was a breach of prosecutorial independence when members of the government pressured her to offer SNC-Lavalin a DPA instead of continuing with a criminal prosecution. Butts and Wernick testified that they had contacted Wilson-Raybould to find a "political solution" after the decision not to offer SNC-Lavalin a DPA was made. Controversially, Wilson-Raybould revealed that she had secretly recorded a conversation she had with Wernick while she was Attorney General.

Following the hearings, Wernick announced his early retirement from the Privy Council. Leader of the Official Opposition Andrew Scheer called for Trudeau's resignation. He further accused Trudeau of political interference, lying to Canadians, and corrupt conduct. Trudeau responded to those comments with a threat of a libel lawsuit through his lawyer. Opposition parties and former attorneys-general asked the Royal Canadian Mounted Police (RCMP) to investigate whether Trudeau's conduct qualifies as obstruction of justice. In April, Trudeau expelled Wilson-Raybould and Philpott from the Liberal caucus.

After a six-month-long investigation, Ethics Commissioner Dion issued a report that concluded that Trudeau had contravened Section 9 of the federal Conflict of Interest Act by improperly pressuring Wilson-Raybould. Dion wrote that while Wilson-Raybould was never officially directed to interfere, this influence was "tantamount to political direction". Dion did not find that any actual political interference in the prosecution occurred; however, he reported he did not have access to all of the evidence. Under the Act, there are no sanctions specified for the violation. After the commissioner's report was released, the Prime Minister released a statement both taking responsibility for and defending his actions. The opposition leaders have called for further investigations.

== Background ==
=== SNC-Lavalin bribery charges ===
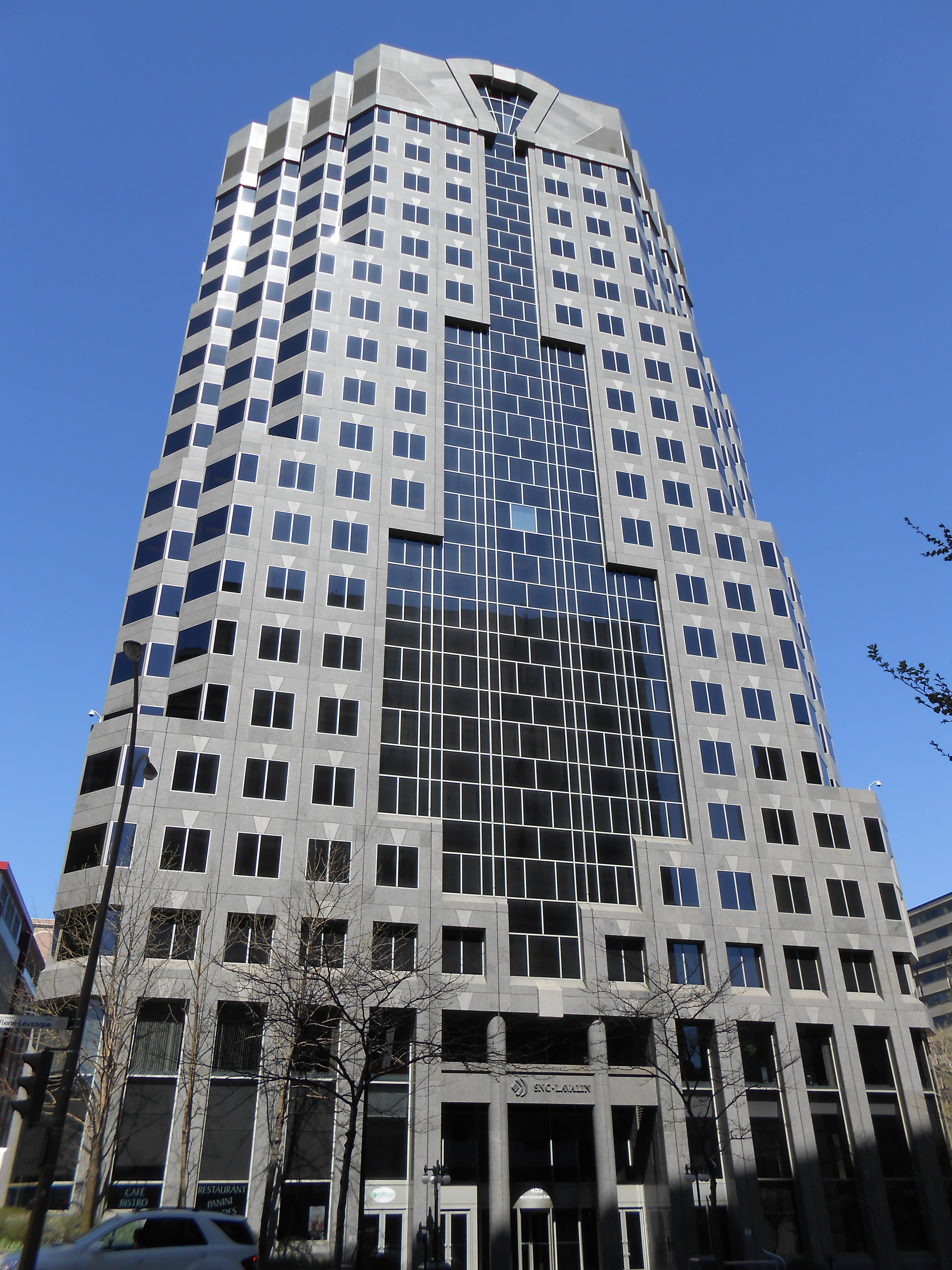
SNC-Lavalin headquarters in Montreal, Quebec.

SNC-Lavalin's Board of Directors became aware of financial irregularities concerning the company's activities in Libya by early 2009. The board raised concerns about the cost of a trip that Al-Saadi Gaddafi took to Canada in 2008—totalling $1.9 million—which SNC-Lavalin paid for. The board issued Stéphane Roy, the company's financial controller, a "serious warning" for the size of the Gaddafi bill. The board had also expressed concerns about the amounts of cash kept by SNC's Libyan office—at that time approximately $10 million—according to the company's chief financial officer. In May 2009, the board ordered that no more than $1 million in cash should be kept in the company's safe in Libya.

On 19 February 2015, the Royal Canadian Mounted Police (RCMP) and the Public Prosecution Service of Canada (PPSC) laid charges against SNC-Lavalin Group Inc. and two of its subsidiaries: SNC-Lavalin International Inc. and SNC-Lavalin Construction Inc. Each firm was charged with one count of fraud under section 380 of the Criminal Code, and one count of corruption under Section 3(1)(b) of the Corruption of Foreign Public Officials Act. The charges allege that between 2001 and 2011, SNC-Lavalin paid CA$48 million in bribes in Libya to officials in the government of Muammar Gaddafi. They also allege that at the same time, the company defrauded Libyan organizations of CA$130 million. On the same day, SNC-Lavalin announced that they were contesting the charges and planned to enter a non-guilty plea.

In Canada, bidders for contracts with Public Services and Procurement Canada must conform to the Integrity Regime legislation passed in July 2015. The Integrity Regime is designed to exclude suppliers that have ethics-related criminal convictions, such as bribery, price fixing, or lobbying offences. If convicted, SNC-Lavalin could be banned from bidding on federal government contracts for up to ten years.

Following the 2015 Canadian federal election, with a Liberal government led by Justin Trudeau coming into power, SNC-Lavalin lobbied the government to change the Criminal Code so that they could avoid criminal prosecution. The effort lasted twenty months, and involved fifty-one meetings with government officials and MPs, as well as officials in the opposition party leaders' offices and in the newly elected Coalition Avenir Québec government. Targets of SNC-Lavalin's lobbying included the Minister of Public Services and Procurement and Accessibility, Carla Qualtrough, as well as officials in the Prime Minister's Office (PMO). The company advocated for the rapid adoption of legislation to allow a new type of sentencing agreement called deferred prosecution agreement (DPA) and changes to Ottawa's Integrity Regime to amend the 10-year contract ineligibility for suppliers with ethics-related criminal convictions.

On recommendation from the Director of Public Prosecutions (DPP) Kathleen Roussel, former SNC-Lavalin Executive Vice President Normand Morin was charged in the Court of Quebec in May 2018 with making illegal donations to Canadian federal political parties. The charges, which were unrelated to the federal charges against the company, alleging that from 2004 to 2011, Morin orchestrated and solicited political donations from employees or their spouses to Canadian federal political parties anonymously on behalf of SNC-Lavalin, to be reimbursed afterwards. The amounts paid included about CA$110,000 to the Liberal Party and CA$8,000 to the Tories. In November 2018, Morin pleaded guilty to two of the five charges, and was fined $2,000. The remaining three charges were dropped by the prosecution.

On 9 October 2018, SNC-Lavalin received a letter from the DPP, informing the company that a decision had been made to not invite the company to negotiate a DPA. The reasons cited in the letter were the "nature and gravity" of the case, "degree of involvement of senior officers of the organization", and that SNC-Lavalin "did not self-report" the alleged crimes.

Later in 2018, SNC-Lavalin brought a case to the Federal Court to compel the Public Prosecution Service to offer it a DPA. In a decision issued on 8 March 2019, the court analysed DPA legislation and affirmed that a decision not to offer a DPA is within the discretion of the prosecutor. As part of the ruling, the court reaffirmed the principle of prosecutorial independence, and SNC-Lavalin's application to compel a DPA was rejected as having "no reasonable prospect of success".

=== Introduction of deferred prosecution agreements ===
In June 2018, Prime Minister Justin Trudeau's government passed an omnibus budget bill which contained amendments to the Criminal Code. The changes introduced a type of sentencing agreement called a deferred prosecution agreement (DPA). Through a DPA, sentencing and remediation agreements are negotiated, under the supervision of a judge, between federal prosecuting authorities and a corporation charged with an offence, usually in the context of fraud or corruption. Following approval and successful completion of the terms of the agreement, a company may apply for a judicial stay of criminal proceedings, and thereby avoid a criminal prosecution, trial, and penalties.

The inclusion of the Criminal Code amendments in the budget legislation raised concerns from MPs from both the Liberal party and opposition parties. Liberal MP Greg Fergus told the House of Commons Finance Committee he was concerned the change appeared to be designed to give corporations implicated in financial crimes "a little slap on the wrist", saying, "It seems we're letting those with the means have an easier time of it than those who don't have the means." According to New Democratic Party (NDP) MP Pierre-Luc Dusseault, the government was not willing to split the Criminal Code amendments from the budget to be passed as a separate bill. Dusseault also said he thought the change was intended to be made quietly. A spokesman for then-Justice Minister Raybould said prosecutors would be responsible to decide whether a company is eligible for the agreements and negotiate the terms, operating at arm's length from the government.

=== Prosecutorial independence ===
Prosecutorial independence is a principle of Canadian constitutional law. In Miazga v Kvello Estate, the Supreme Court of Canada held that, "The independence of the Attorney General is so fundamental to the integrity and efficiency of the criminal justice system that it is constitutionally entrenched. The principle of independence requires that the Attorney General act independently of political pressures from the government." Similarly, in Krieger v Law Society of Alberta, the Supreme Court held, "It is a constitutional principle that the Attorneys General of this country must act independently of partisan concerns when exercising their delegated sovereign authority to initiate, continue or terminate prosecutions." The role of the Attorney General of Canada is bound by the so-called "Shawcross principle", based on a statement by Lord Shawcross in 1951. The principle (or doctrine) states that the Attorney General must take into account matters of public interest, that assistance from cabinet colleagues must be limited to advice, that responsibility for the decision is that of the Attorney General alone, and that the government is not to put pressure on him or her.

In practice, prosecutorial independence is enforced by maintaining an independent office responsible for prosecutions. Until 2006, Canada's Federal Prosecution Service was located within the Department of Justice, making it vulnerable to political interference by the Prime Minister or Cabinet. The Public Prosecution Service of Canada was established in 2006, following the enactment of the Director of Public Prosecutions Act, as an agency independent of the Department of Justice. Under the Act, the DPP is responsible for all federal criminal prosecutions. However, the Attorney General can issue a directive to the DPP regarding an ongoing prosecution or take control of a prosecution. Such directives must be provided in writing and published as a notice in the Canada Gazette, the official newspaper of the Government of Canada.

== Discovery and initial reactions ==
On 7 February 2019, The Globe and Mail reported on allegations made by unnamed sources that beginning in October 2018, the Prime Minister's Office (PMO) put pressure on then-Minister of Justice and Attorney General Jody Wilson-Raybould to intervene in ongoing criminal proceedings against SNC-Lavalin to offer the company a deferred prosecution agreement. Wilson-Raybould refused. Following the resignation of Scott Brison, she was moved to the Veterans Affairs Ministry in a Cabinet shuffle on 14 January 2019. The move was widely seen as a demotion, and there was speculation at the time about the reason for it. At the time, both Trudeau and Wilson-Raybould denied she had been demoted.

The article stated that after charges were brought against SNC-Lavalin in October 2017, the company approached officials in Ottawa, including members of the Prime Minister's Office, to secure a DPA. A criminal verdict against SNC-Lavalin would lead to the company being barred from federal contracts for 10 years, and possibly result in its bankruptcy. According to the article, sources in the Liberal Party said Wilson-Raybould knew the DPA legislation in the Criminal Code was intended to help SNC-Lavalin avoid a criminal conviction. The Director of Public Prosecutions, Kathleen Roussel, had rejected the request for a DPA in October 2018. As Attorney General, Wilson-Raybould had the power to overrule that decision, and would have had to do so in writing in the Canada Gazette, the official government newspaper. According to the article, sources claimed that Wilson-Raybould had refused to overrule Roussel's rejection because she trusted Roussel's judgment, and she wanted to avoid even the perception of political interference. The Prime Minister's office said in an email to The Globe and Mail that it had not directed the attorney-general to draw any conclusions on the matter. Liberal MPs received internal messaging that the allegations were "false."

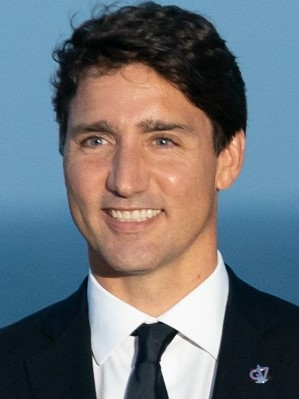
Justin Trudeau in 2019

In the days following the publication of the article in The Globe and Mail, opposition party politicians and the media questioned whether the reason for Wilson-Raybould's removal was her refusal to prevent criminal prosecution of SNC-Lavalin. Trudeau denied the allegations, telling reporters, "The allegations reported in the story are false." He stated, "At no time did I or my office direct the current or previous attorney-general to make any particular decision in this matter." Wilson-Raybould's replacement as Minister of Justice and Attorney General, David Lametti, said in the House of Commons that the Prime Minister's office had not given directives to or put pressure on either of them. Wilson-Raybould would not comment on the article, saying she was bound by solicitor-client privilege.

On 11 February, the Conflict of Interest and Ethics Commissioner of the Parliament of Canada Mario Dion said he would open an investigation into the allegations of political interference by the PMO. In a letter to NDP ethics critic Charlie Angus and MP Nathan Cullen, Dion said he had "reason to believe that a possible contravention of section 9 [of the Conflict of Interest Act] may have occurred". That section bars public officials from attempting to influence decisions which could "improperly further another person's private interests". However, the NDP MPs had not filed a complaint about a violation of section 9, only Democracy Watch had by letter to the Ethics Commissioner on 8 February. The Ethics Commissioner's investigation would continue to claim throughout the process that he had self-initiated his investigation, even though Green Party Leader and MP Elizabeth May filed a complaint in April and then again on 2 May citing Democracy Watch's complaint, alleging the violation of section 9, and requesting an investigation by the Ethics Commissioner (when an MP requests an investigation under the Act, the Ethics Commissioner is required to investigate).

== Wilson-Raybould resignation ==
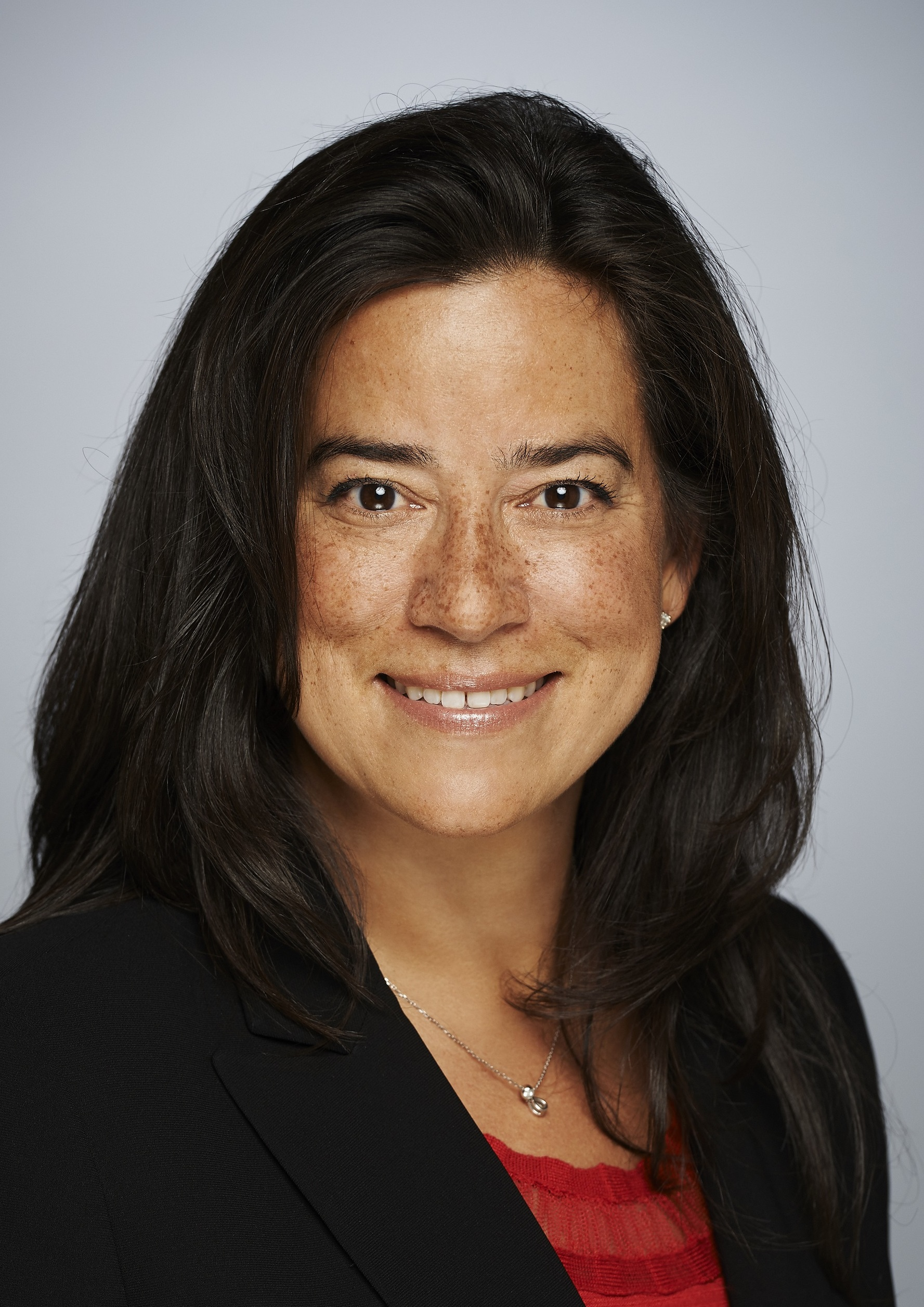
Jody Wilson-Raybould in 2014

In a press conference on the same day as the ethics investigation was announced, Trudeau said he had full confidence in Wilson-Raybould and that they had spoken the previous fall, when he told her directly that decisions regarding the DPP were hers alone. Trudeau also said he respected her view that she could not comment due to privilege, adding, "I also highlight that we're bound by cabinet confidentiality. In our system of governance, her presence in cabinet should speak for itself."

Wilson-Raybould resigned from Cabinet the next day, 12 February. In her resignation letter, Wilson-Raybould reaffirmed her commitment to serving in Parliament, saying she had retained Thomas Cromwell, the retired Supreme Court of Canada Justice, and was getting advice on what she was legally allowed to discuss publicly. Trudeau said he was "puzzled and obviously disappointed" by the resignation, telling reporters that "if anyone, particularly the attorney-general, felt that we were not doing our job responsibly and according to all the rules as a government, it was her responsibility to come forward to me this past fall and highlight that directly to me. She did not."

In response to the developing events, the House of Commons Justice Committee met on 13 February to vote on hearing testimony from the PMO officials involved, as well as Wilson-Raybould herself. What would be the first of multiple hearings originally only had Lametti, Deputy Minister of Justice Nathalie Drouin, and Michael Wernick as witnesses, as the Liberal majority on the committee blocked attempts by opposition party MPs to have Wilson-Raybould testify.

Three days after the press conference where Trudeau said Wilson-Raybould had not talked to him about any concerns, on 15 February, Trudeau told reporters that Wilson-Raybould had come to him the previous fall to ask if he was directing her to make a particular decision on the file, but that he had told her the decision was her own. During the same press conference, he denied again that Wilson-Raybould's removal from the Attorney General position was due to her refusal to drop prosecution of SNC-Lavalin, saying, "If Scott Brison had not stepped down from cabinet, Jody Wilson-Raybould would still be minister of justice and attorney-general of Canada."

Anonymous sources told The Canadian Press agency that Wilson-Raybould "had become a thorn in the side of the cabinet, someone insiders say was difficult to get along with, known to berate fellow cabinet ministers openly at the table". The Union of British Columbia Indian Chiefs argued that this was a "racist and sexist" attack on Wilson-Raybould, prompting Trudeau to apologize for the remarks.

== Parliamentary hearings ==
During an emergency meeting on 13 February 2019, the Liberal-dominated Justice Committee of the House of Commons voted down opposition parties' bids to hear from the former attorney general and key members of the Prime Minister's Office, stating that the role of the committee is "not an investigative body". Instead, it was proposed to study some of the legal issues at the heart of the matter, such as the Shawcross doctrine and deferred prosecution agreements. As a result, only current Justice Minister David Lametti, Deputy Justice Minister Nathalie Drouin, and Privy Council Clerk Michael Wernick were originally invited to testify.

The Senate of Canada debated a 28 February motion to launch its own study into the affair, but it was not endorsed by the majority of Senators.

=== Hearing on 21 February 2019 ===
In response to the claims, the Justice Committee held a series of three public hearings on the alleged interference. Wernick, the Clerk of the Privy Council, appeared before the committee. He disputed the allegations of undue pressure on Wilson-Raybould and stated that The Globe and Mail article contained errors and unfounded speculation.

=== Hearing on 27 February 2019 ===
Wilson-Raybould testified before the committee, corroborating the report by The Globe and Mail and detailing the alleged political interference. In her prepared statement, Wilson-Raybould said:

For a period of approximately four months between September and December 2018, I experienced a consistent and sustained effort by many people within the government to seek to politically interfere in the exercise of prosecutorial discretion in my role as the Attorney General of Canada in an inappropriate effort to secure a Deferred Prosecution Agreement with SNC-Lavalin.

Wilson-Raybould provided details and dates of the meetings, and named eleven people involved with the alleged efforts to interfere, including Trudeau, Wernick, Gerald Butts, Katie Telford, Bill Morneau, and other high-ranking officials in the PMO and the Minister of Finance's office.

Despite the attempts to convince her to reconsider her stance given the possible economic and political consequences, Wilson-Raybould said she was "undaunted in her position to not pursue a Deferred Prosecution Agreement". She maintains the belief that despite the pressure she felt, she did not believe what transpired was illegal. When asked why she did not resign from her position during the time she said improper pressure was being applied, Wilson-Raybould said: "I was, in my opinion, doing my job as the attorney general. I was protecting a fundamental constitutional principle of prosecutorial independence and the independence of our judiciary. That's the job of the attorney general."

Wilson-Raybould also reiterated that Order in Council leaves in place various constraints that prevent her from speaking freely about matters that occurred after she left the post of Attorney General, communications while she was Minister of Veterans Affairs, her resignation from that post, and her presentation to Cabinet after her resignation. She stated that she would be willing to testify further if released from those restrictions.

Trudeau gave a short press conference in Montreal following the hearings on 27 February, denying the allegations. "I and my staff always acted appropriately and professionally", he said. "I completely disagree with the characterization of the former attorney general about these events ... The decision around SNC-Lavalin was Ms. Wilson-Raybould's and hers alone. This decision is the attorney general's alone."

=== Hearing on 6 March 2019 ===
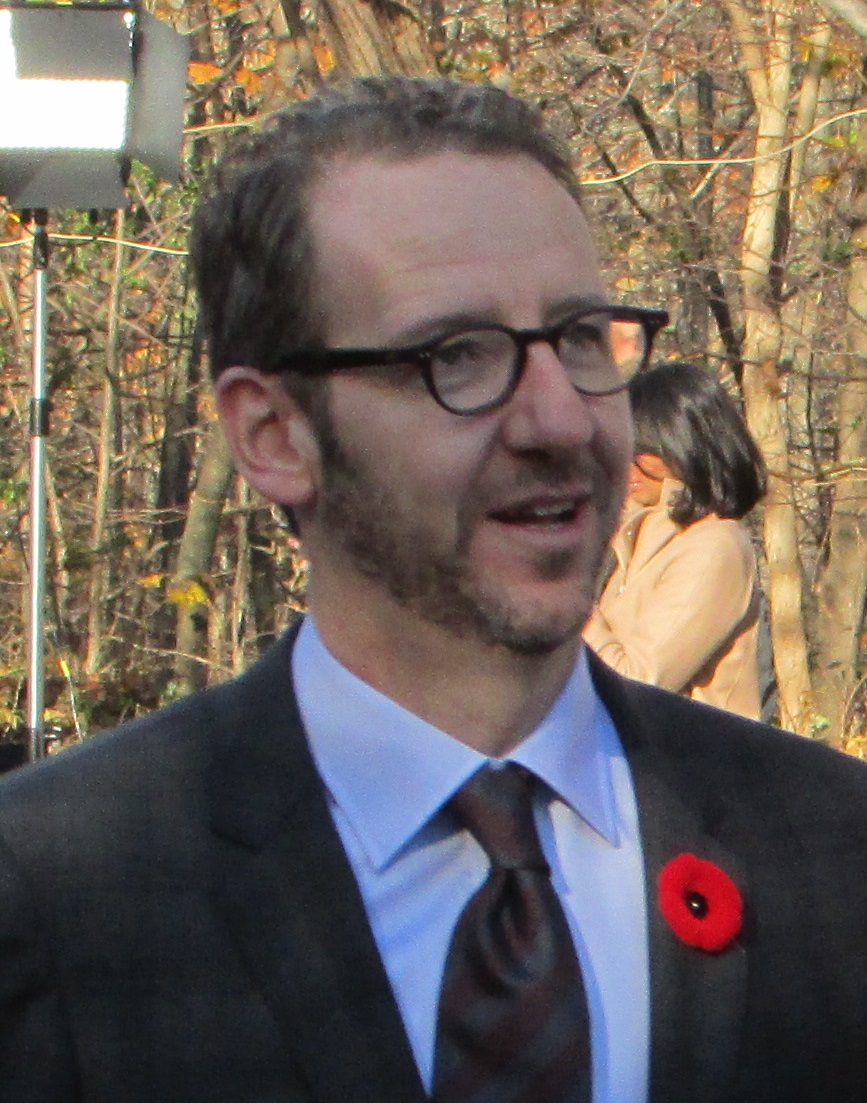
Gerald Butts, the former Principal Secretary to Justin Trudeau

On 6 March 2019, the Justice Committee held a hearing on the claims, at which Butts testified. Butts, who had been implicated in the affair by Wilson-Raybould at the previous hearing, served as the Principal Secretary to Trudeau in the PMO.

During his testimony, Butts said that he did not want to discredit Wilson-Raybould's testimony, but wanted to offer his own "different version of events". He stated he believed that "nothing inappropriate occurred" and that "nothing inappropriate was alleged to have occurred until after the cabinet shuffle". Butts said that any conversations between Wilson-Raybould and officials in the PMO were intended only to ensure that she understood the full potential impact of a criminal conviction of SNC-Lavalin and that at no time did anyone in the PMO attempt to influence Wilson-Raybould's decision. "It was not about second-guessing the decision. It was about ensuring that the attorney general was making her decision with the absolute best evidence possible", he testified. He also noted that he believed a period of twelve days was too compressed for such an important decision.

Butts further stated that no concerns were raised by Wilson-Raybould until after 12 January cabinet shuffle had occurred: "If this was wrong, and wrong in the way it is alleged to have been wrong, why are we having this discussion now and not in the middle of September, or October, or November, or December?"

Liberal members of the committee defeated a motion to produce all government communications between Butts and other parties mentioned in the SNC-Lavalin affair.

At the hearing, Wernick testified for a second time, and stated that the decision to consider a DPA is never final, and that he was only reminding Wilson-Raybould to take public interest considerations into account.

Deputy Justice Minister Nathalie Drouin also testified at the hearing. When asked, Drouin stated that it was not for her to say if the time taken for the due diligence review was adequate or not, and that she was not part of the due diligence exercise carried out by Wilson-Raybould regarding this case. Drouin also replied that "It's the responsibility of a prosecutor to assess and reassess ... in light of new facts and evidence put in front of the prosecutor."

Drouin also said that at the end of October 2018, the Privy Council Office (PCO) asked her department for advice on the potential impact on SNC-Lavalin if a deferred prosecution agreement was not pursued. That advice was "not provided to PCO at the request of the minister's office".

Following Butts' testimony, Trudeau gave a press conference in Ottawa on 7 March. He again denied all allegations of inappropriate or illegal pressure, and said that an "erosion of trust" and "breakdown in communications" had developed between him, his staff and the former Attorney General. Trudeau also confirmed that during a 17 September meeting he asked Wilson-Raybould to "revisit her decision" not to negotiate an out-of-court settlement with SNC-Lavalin, and asked his staff to follow up regarding Wilson-Raybould's final decision.

=== Hearing on 13 March 2019 ===
During the Committee hearing, Liberal MPs blocked an effort by opposition party members to immediately invite Wilson-Raybould back to speak further about the government's effort to put pressure on her, despite the former justice minister's willingness to testify again. Instead, Liberal members voted to reconvene the Justice Committee in-camera on 19 March to consider whether to invite Wilson-Raybould and other senior government officials to testify.

=== Conclusion of Justice Committee hearings ===
On 19 March 2019, the Justice Committee held an in-camera meeting where Liberal members introduced and passed a motion to end any further probe into the SNC-Lavalin scandal, indicating that they preferred to leave any remaining investigation to the ethics commissioner. In a written letter to the committee chair, the Liberal members stated that "No witness was prevented from providing evidence on any relevant information during the period covered by the waiver", and concluded that "Canadians can judge for themselves the facts, the perspectives and relevant legal principles". In total, the Justice Committee held eleven meetings over five weeks, accumulating thirteen hours of testimony from ten different witnesses. The committee did not hear from some individuals implicated in the controversy by Wilson-Raybould, including Katie Telford (Trudeau's chief of staff) and senior staffers Ben Chin, Elder Marques, and Mathieu Bouchard. The Conservative Party and New Democratic Party also maintain that Wilson-Raybould should have been called back to committee to respond to testimony from Wernick and Butts.

=== Further submissions from Wilson-Raybould ===
On 29 March, the Justice Committee released a recording, made secretly by Wilson-Raybould, of the telephone call between her and Wernick that took place on 19 December 2018. In it, Wernick told Wilson-Raybould that Trudeau wanted a DPA for SNC-Lavalin "one way or another". Wilson-Raybould responded that the request was inappropriate political interference in the justice system and that she was not comfortable having the conversation. The recording was accompanied by a submission of forty pages supplementing her original testimony, including copies of texts and emails, outlining Wilson-Raybould's view of events and their implications for prosecutorial independence. In her submission, she also explained that her decision to resign from the cabinet was prompted by Trudeau's suggestion the day earlier that "her continued presence in his cabinet speaks for itself".

The PMO responded that Wernick never briefed Trudeau on this conversation. Wernick said that he did not brief the Prime Minister on the call due to the Holiday season break, and that he did not discuss SNC again with the PMO until the story was leaked in early February.

== Reactions and aftermath ==
On 11 February 2019, after mounting pressure from Democracy Watch (Canada), the Conservatives and NDP, Mario Dion, the Parliament of Canada's Ethics Commissioner, launched an investigation into the alleged interference. The scope of the ethics review is to look into any possible contravention of rules prohibiting public office holders from using their position to influence decisions that could further another person's private interest.

Elizabeth May, the leader of the Green Party, called for an independent, RCMP-led investigation into the allegations, stating that the "Ethics Commissioner is not the right place to seek such an inquiry; neither is the justice committee". Following the Justice Committee hearings on 27 February, Opposition Leader Andrew Scheer called for Trudeau's resignation, saying that he had "lost the moral authority to govern". On 28 February, Scheer sent a letter to RCMP Commissioner Brenda Lucki, calling for an investigation into Trudeau's actions in relation to the controversy. Five former attorneys-general called on the RCMP to investigate possible obstruction of justice.

On 11 March, the OECD Working Group on Bribery, of which Canada is a member, wrote to the Canadian government outlining its concerns about potential political interference in the case, and saying that it would "closely monitor investigations into the SNC-Lavalin affair by the House of Commons justice committee and the federal ethics commissioner". The Working Group did clarify it had no reason to doubt the approach the Canadian government is taking, and noted Canada's willingness to keep it fully informed of the proceedings at its next meeting in June 2019.

Following 19 March Justice Committee meeting, opposition parties asked the House of Commons Ethics Committee to launch its own investigation into the affair, and called for Wilson-Raybould to testify at the committee by no later than 27 March. This motion was defeated on 26 March by the Liberal majority on the committee. The Conservative Party protested the decision of the Justice Committee to conclude its proceedings by forcing an all-night session of the House of Commons.

On 20 March, the CEO of SNC-Lavalin, Neil Bruce, stated in an interview with The Globe and Mail that the company was "fully reformed" and "does not understand why it was not given a deal". Bruce said that Canadians had appeared to have "given up" on SNC-Lavalin and that the general public does not understand the potential economic consequences of a ten-year ban on federal contracts. On 28 March, a presentation was obtained by The Canadian Press press agency which described SNC-Lavalin's "Plan B" if they could not secure a remediation agreement. The plan, provided to Public Prosecution Service of Canada in autumn 2018, included moving its Montreal headquarters to the United States within a year, reducing its workforce, and eventually winding down Canadian operations. A spokesperson for the company confirmed its authenticity, calling it a "confidential document" and maintaining that a DPA is "the best way to protect and grow the almost 9,000 direct Canadian SNC-Lavalin jobs, as well as thousands of indirect jobs".

On 7 April 2019, Conservative leader Andrew Scheer made public a letter he had received on 31 March from Prime Minister Justin Trudeau's lawyer Julian Porter, which threatened a libel suit regarding statements Scheer made on 29 March that accused Trudeau of political interference, lying to Canadians, and corrupt conduct. Scheer stood by his comments, describing the letter as an "intimidation tactic" and saying, "If Mr. Trudeau believes he has a case against me, I urge him to follow through on his threat immediately."

On 18 December 2019, SNC-Lavalin Construction Inc. pleaded guilty to fraud contrary to section 380(1) a) of the Criminal Code of Canada. The company stated that, between 2001 and 2011, over $47.5 million in bribes had been paid to Al-Saadi Gaddafi. The money was directed through two representative companies, both listing former SLCI vice-president and president Riadh Ben Aissa as the sole beneficial owner. In return for the payments, Al-Saadi Gaddafi applied his influence to secure construction contracts for SNC-Lavalin Construction. Payments of personal benefits totalling over $73.5 million were also made through the representative companies to Ben Aissa and Sami Bebawi, former president of SLCI. As part of its plea agreement with the Public Prosecution Service, SLCI was fined $280 million.

=== Ethics Commissioner's report ===
Mario Dion, the Parliament of Canada's Ethics Commissioner, began an investigation in February 2019 in response to the complaint filed 8 February by Democracy Watch (Canada). On 14 August 2019, he released a report that concluded Trudeau had broken section 9 of the Conflict of Interest Act by improperly pressuring Wilson-Raybould. The report details lobbying efforts by SNC-Lavalin to influence prosecution since at least February 2016, including the lobbying efforts to enact DPA legislation. The report analyses SNC-Lavalin's interests and finds that the lobbying effort advanced private interests of the company, rather than public interests. Dion concluded that Wilson-Raybould had resisted the improper pressure put upon her and he did not find any political interference in the prosecution. He noted that he did not have complete information about the case because the Privy Council would not release nine witnesses that claimed to have information about the case.

The report's analysis section discusses the topics of prosecutorial independence and Shawcross doctrine (dual role of Attorney General) to draw the conclusion that the influence was improper and a violation of the Conflict of Interest Act as Democracy Watch (Canada) called for in its February 8 complaint. However, some legal analysts, such as Errol Mendes, professor of constitutional law at the University of Ottawa, veteran attorney David Hamer, and Kenneth Jull, adjunct law professor at the University of Toronto and advisor at Toronto business law firm Gardiner Roberts, disagreed with Dion's interpretation and suggested that the report may have overreached in its findings.

Democracy Watch filed a lawsuit challenging the Ethics Commissioner's report for failing to find Gerald Butts and other staff of the Prime Minister's Office, then-Clerk of the Privy Council Michael Wernick, then-Finance Minister Bill Morneau and his staff, guilty of violating the Conflict of Interest Act, given they had all participated in pressuring the Attorney General in the same way that Trudeau had. The case was expected to be heard by the Federal Court by mid-2021.

An emergency meeting of the House of Commons Ethics Committee to discuss the report further was scheduled for 21 August 2019. A motion by the Opposition to have Dion testify before the Committee was defeated 5-4, with only Liberal MP Nate Erskine-Smith breaking with the Liberal majority on the committee. An additional motion by the NDP to have Trudeau himself testify, along with Finance Minister Bill Morneau and his former chief of staff Ben Chin, was also defeated.

It came to light on 15 August that the Ethics Commissioner did not have the jurisdiction to impose sanctions for such a violation. Responding to the report, Trudeau said he accepted it and took responsibility but disagreed with its findings. Scheer renewed his calls for a RCMP investigation, while May and Singh reiterated their calls for an inquiry. A RCMP spokesperson declined to confirm or deny whether an investigation is underway, saying that the police force is carefully reviewing the facts and will take "appropriate actions as required".

After the report was made public, Wilson-Raybould released a statement saying it was a vindication of her positions on prosecutorial independence and the role of Attorney General. She stated that the report confirms that she acted appropriately at all times and that the staff of the Prime Minister's office acted improperly. On the day the report was released, Wilson-Raybould told a reporter she had not been contacted by the RCMP. The following day, she clarified that while she had not been contacted by the RCMP since the release of the Ethics Commissioner's report, she had been contacted by the police force concerning the affair earlier in the spring.

Subsequent to the release of the Dion report and the McLellan report, Trudeau addressed their content, saying that he took “full responsibility” for how the case was handled, but would not apologize for protecting Canadian jobs. Ian Lee, professor at Carleton University, and Philip Cross, fellow at the Macdonald-Laurier Institute, have disputed Trudeau's jobs claims, saying that even if SNC-Lavalin was banned from bidding on federal contracts it would be able to continue to bid on provincial and municipal projects and other companies winning federal contracts would employ Canadian workers. Michel Nadeau, former deputy chief of Caisse de dépôt said it was unlikely SNC-Lavalin would move its headquarters from Montreal. The Quebec Premier François Legault welcomed Trudeau's statements saying it is important for the Prime Minister to protect well-paying jobs.

=== McLellan report ===
On 18 March, Trudeau announced that former Deputy Prime Minister Anne McLellan would serve as a Special Advisor to examine whether a single minister should continue to hold the positions of Minister of Justice and Attorney General. The advisor would also analyze the current roles, policies, and practices of government officials who interact with the Attorney General. McLellan was to report her recommendations to the Prime Minister by 30 June 2019.

On 13 August Trudeau said he would not release the McLellan until the publication of the Dion report. Jagmeet Singh called the delay "troubling".

On the same day, 14 August, as the Dion report was released, McLellan's report on whether to separate the roles of Minister of Justice and Attorney General (MoJAG) was made public by the PM who commissioned it. It recommended keeping the position combined as it has been since Confederation. McLellan recommended various changes and clarifications to protocols and communications, ask the Attorney General to explain decisions to direct or not direct prosecutions, explicitly note the independence of the Attorney General in law, educate parliamentarians, update the Department of Justice Act and change the name of the Department of Justice to the Department of Justice and Office of the Attorney General of Canada. McLellan called for a new oath of office that identifies the Attorney-General's role in upholding the rule of law. As well a "detailed protocol to govern ministerial consultations in specific prosecutions" should be written so as to govern the staff who have access to the Attorney-General in sensitive cases.

Writing in Maclean's, Paul Wells found that "The way other ministers, political staff, bureaucrats and the PMO feel free to give advice to an AG is way too ad hoc for McLellan’s taste." To regulate all these interactions calls for the aforementioned protocol. Wells found that such a protocol "would have made the SNC-Lavalin mess impossible," had one existed. He lists no less than six individuals who would have had no access to Wilson-Raybould. Wells cites the passage of the McLellan report: "Other ministers should not be able to insert themselves into the decision-making process by demanding to consult with the Attorney General.. In most cases, the consultations should be done through written representations. This will discourage discussions of improper considerations." Wells wrote in conclusion that in the SNC-Lavalin affair, "the Trudeau PMO’s preferred solution—-that a long chain of informal but highly questionable chats take place with no traceable record of their existence-—[would not be] acceptable or compatible with established practice in other jurisdictions."

Writing in the Institute for Research on Public Policy's Policy Options, Aaron Wudrick (then the federal director of the Canadian Taxpayers Federation) thought that in order to ensure another scandal like the SNC-Lavalin affair would be impossible, would require both the partition of the roles of Attorney-General and Minister of Justice, and an end to the practice of omnibus bills which "prevent proper parliamentary scrutiny." Wudrick supports his first conclusion with the fact that Canadian practice is alien to the United Kingdom, from whence Canada derives its system of government.

=== Leaks about Joyal recommendation ===
On 25 March 2019, CTV News reported that there was a conflict between Wilson-Raybould and Trudeau in 2017 when Trudeau disagreed with a recommendation by Wilson-Raybould to appoint Glenn Joyal to the Supreme Court of Canada, replacing Beverley McLachlin as the Chief Justice of Canada. The report suggested the Prime Minister could have had reasons unrelated to the SNC-Lavalin affair for moving Wilson-Raybould out of the Justice portfolio. Wilson-Raybould denied there was any conflict with Trudeau over the Supreme Court recommendation. Trudeau and Wilson-Raybould both condemned the leaks and denied that they were the source.

The Privacy Commissioner of Canada launched an investigation into the leak of confidential information on 4 April, after receiving a request from opposition parties. The investigation was to include organizations covered by the Privacy Act, such as the Privy Council Office and the Department of Justice. The Privacy Act covers neither ministerial offices nor the PMO.

=== Other resignations ===
Gerald Butts resigned as the Principal Secretary to Prime Minister Trudeau on 18 February 2019. When resigning, he denied that Wilson-Raybould had been pressured, saying that the accusation that he had pressured Wilson-Raybould was distracting from the work of the PMO.

Jane Philpott, the President of the Treasury Board, resigned from her post in Trudeau's cabinet on 4 March in solidarity with Wilson-Raybould. In her statement she said that she had "lost confidence in how the government has dealt with this matter and in how it has responded to the issues raised". Philpott had been considered one of Trudeau's most trusted ministers. Philpott, then the health minister, had worked together with Wilson-Raybould on the assisted-dying legislation passed in 2016.

Michael Wernick announced on 18 March that he would be retiring ahead of schedule from his position as the Clerk of the Privy Council and Secretary to Cabinet "due to recent events", namely the erosion of trust and being seen as partisan; which would affect the civil service as a whole and cast doubt on his position should an opposition party form the next government. On 18 April, Wernick retired as Privy Council clerk.

=== Party expulsions ===
On 29 March, CBC published an article saying that the Liberal caucus in the House of Commons was planning to vote on expelling Wilson-Raybould and Philpott. Caucus members said they did not think Wilson-Raybould and Philpott could remain party members, "given the damage done to the government by the SNC-Lavalin affair". Liberal MPs criticized Wilson-Raybould's release of the phone call recording, with Minister of Tourism Mélanie Joly describing it as "fundamentally wrong" and the former Solicitor General under Jean Chrétien, Wayne Fox, calling it "about as low as you can go". Trudeau did not state a position on the vote, saying, "As for what Dr. Philpott and Ms. Wilson-Raybould intend to do as next steps, people are going to have to ask them". The day the vote was scheduled to proceed, Wilson-Raybould wrote a letter to the caucus arguing that she should remain a member, saying "Ultimately the choice that is before you is about what kind of party you want to be a part of, what values it will uphold, the vision that animates it, and indeed the type of people it will attract and make it up." Ultimately, no recorded caucus vote was held.

Trudeau expelled Wilson-Raybould and Philpott from the Liberal Caucus on 2 April 2019. He also removed Wilson-Raybould and Philpott as the Liberal party candidates for Vancouver Granville and Markham—Stouffville respectively in the 2019 Canadian federal election. At a press conference, Trudeau said that trust between the two women and the rest of the Liberal caucus had been broken, calling Wilson-Raybould's recording "unconscionable". He also talked about the danger of "civil wars within parties", saying "Our political opponents win when Liberals are divided. We can't afford to make that mistake. Canadians are counting on us." After she was informed of the decision, Wilson-Raybould stated she has no regrets, and did what she thought "needed to be done based on principles and values that must always transcend party". On the same day, Philpott said she was "stunned" at having been expelled without being given a chance to speak to the national caucus, and that the attacks on her and Wilson Raybould had been based on "inaccuracies and falsehoods".

The decision was condemned by all opposition parties, with Conservative Party leader Andrew Scheer calling it a "betrayal of justice" and saying that people who blow the whistle on misconduct should be protected, not punished. NDP Leader Jagmeet Singh said that Wilson-Raybould tried to "put integrity and what's right for Canadians over what helps the Liberals" and that she "deserved better". Green Party leader Elizabeth May said Wilson-Raybould had shown honour and integrity in her work, and that "the laws weren't broken because she held firm". The day after the expulsions, about fifty young women in the House of Commons as part of a delegation of Daughters of the Vote, a youth leadership event, turned their backs on Trudeau in protest during his speech to the delegation. The now independent MPs experienced social shunning from many of their former Liberal colleagues, which began to form when they resigned from the cabinet.

In May 2019, Wilson-Raybould and Philpott announced their intentions to run as independent candidates for the 2019 federal election. In an interview with the New York Times, Trudeau maintained his innocence in the matter and suggested that the severity of the issue had been overly exaggerated, stating that "the media and opposition were being distracted with this internal dispute that has been invented and amplified."

=== RCMP inquiry ===
On 10 September 2019, The Globe and Mail published a story claiming the Trudeau government was not co-operating with an RCMP inquiry into potential obstruction of justice. A waiver for confidentiality was not provided by the Clerk of the Privy Council nor did Trudeau override the Clerk which would allow RCMP access to both staffers and materials. According to the report, sources who spoke to The Globe and Mail were told to not discuss matters regarding the scandal with police officials. While Scheer said the RCMP were investigating the Prime Minister's Office there was no evidence as of 10 September 2019 that the RCMP has begun an investigation into anyone in the PMO. Wilson-Raybould was interviewed by investigators on 10 September 2019.

== See also ==
- Premiership of Justin Trudeau – Period of the Government of Canada from 2015 to 2025
- SNC-Lavalin
- SNC-Lavalin Kerala hydroelectric scandal – 1995 financial scandal in India
