= Canadian House of Commons Standing Committee on Justice and Human Rights =

Standing committee of the House of Commons of Canada

The House of Commons Standing Committee on Justice and Human Rights (JUST) is a standing committee of the House of Commons of Canada. The Standing Committee on Justice and Legal Affairs, as it was then known, began their first session on February 17, 1966, under the Chair Alan John Patrick Cameron (Liberal Party of Canada). More recently, in December 2018, under its current name, JUST, the Committee submitted their unanimous report to the House of Commons entitled Moving Forward in the Fight Against Human Trafficking in Canada. In April 2019, a JUST press release announced that they were undertaking a study of online hate. In 2016, the committee began a multi-part study on access to justice in Canada, which includes a study of the restoration of Court Challenges Program (CCP) and a study on access to legal aid.

== Mandate ==
The Committee looks over and summarizes the administrative and management designs of Department of Justice and its subsidiary agencies Canadian Human Rights Commission, Office of the Commissioner for Federal Judicial Affairs of Canada, Supreme Court of Canada, Courts Administration Service, Administrative Tribunals Support Service of Canada, and Public Prosecution Service of Canada.

The committee has the ability to make changes to federal laws with particular concerns to Criminal Code, Youth Criminal Justice Act, Divorce Act, Civil Marriage Act, Canadian Human Rights Act, Judges Act, the Courts Administration Service Act, and the Supreme Court Act

The committee also researches on these areas above on behalf of the House of Commons or on its own preference.

== History ==
Originally, JUST was called the Standing Committee on Justice and Legal Affairs which was subsequently changed to the Standing Committee on Justice and the Solicitor General. The current name was put in place by the House of Commons effective "September 30, 1997" as it combine its mandate with the "former Standing Committee on Human Rights and the Status of Persons with Disabilities." The name was changed again in February 2004 to the Standing Committee on Justice and Human Rights, Public Safety and Emergency Preparedness, but was changed back in April 2006.

The first session of the Standing Committee on Justice and Legal Affairs on February 17, 1966, until April 21, 1966, under the Chair Alan John Patrick Cameron (Liberal Party of Canada) from constituency High Park, ON.

== Remediation agreements in relation to SNC-Lavalin ==
In 2018 and 2019, the JUST standing committee undertook a study of remediation agreements, the Shawcross doctrine as they relate to the SNC-Lavalin affair.

In his submission to the JUST committee, the President of the Canadian National Section of the International Commission of Jurists (ICJ), Errol Mendes, who is also a constitutional and international law professor at the University of Ottawa, recommended that an "authoritative set of guidelines for the roles of the attorney general, the cabinet and the Privy Council Office relating to attorney general and the [Director of Public Prosecutions (DPP)] conduct and decisions on prosecutions" be established. On February 27, former Attorney General of Canada, Jody Wilson-Raybould, provided lengthy testimony and answered questions about the possibility of political interference in the SNL-Lavalin prosecution. She also clarified her roles as both Minister of Justice and Attorney General. The committee voted in favour of allowing Wilson-Raybould to provide her testimony before them and the public.

== Bill C-78, An Act to amend the Divorce Act ==
On December 5, 2018, the JUST committee voted in favour of progressing amendments through their Report 23, "Bill C-78, An Act to amend the Divorce Act, the Family Orders and Agreements Enforcement Assistance Act and the Garnishment, Attachment and Pension Diversion Act and to make consequential amendments to another Act". The report was presented to the House of Commons on December 7, 2019. Major considerations for making these amendments are to take into consideration that each child has different needs and the needs of one child should not be imposed on the needs of the others, how domestic abuse affects the financial security of the victim, while also incorporating tools that will help parents, which are mostly women, receive "billions of dollars in unpaid child support payments in Canada..."

== Access to justice ==
The committee launched their broad study on access to justice in Canada on February 23, 2016.

On September 20, 2016, in a news release, they submitted their report Access to Justice –Part 1: The Court Challenges Program which was the first phase of that study.

The federal government said it was committed to restoring the Court Challenges Program (CCP), which was first created in 1970 but was cancelled in 2006. The original CCP "provided funding for cases of national significance related to important legislative and policy areas, including access to social and economic benefits for disadvantaged groups and access to education in minority official languages."

The next phase of the JUST study deals with access to legal aid.

== Human trafficking ==
On June 8, 2017, meeting, JUST unanimously agreed to conduct a study of human trafficking in Canada and present a report of its findings to the House of Commons. The report was mandated through the House of Commons' Standing Order 108(2) and was the 24th report submitted by JUST. From February 15 and May 22, 2018, JUST held 8 meetings and heard from over fifty as well as receiving about sixty written submissions. On December 11, 2018, the Committee submitted a unanimous report to the House of Commons, which examined human trafficking in Canada, entitled Moving Forward in the Fight Against Human Trafficking in Canada.

In their December 11 press release, the Committee described human trafficking, "as a form of modern slavery", a "heinous crime and a grave violation of human rights". In Canada as in many places around the world "[d]espite all the efforts of governments and civil society to combat it, this crime still ensnares many victims".

== On-line hate study - April 11, 2019 ongoing ==
One April 11, 2019 JUST committee announced their study on on-line hate with an invitation to the public to participate.

In their news release the announcing the study and inviting public participation, the committee cite police-reports of a 47% increase in violent hate crimes in Canada that were motivated by "race, ethnicity, religion, gender, gender identity and expression, and sexual orientation." In their news release the committee said that "public incitement of hatred" had "played a greater role in the increase than violent hate crimes." The study takes place as part of "worldwide discussions on how to better mitigate the incitement of hatred through online platforms" given that "nearly all Canadians under the age of 45 use the internet everyday [sic]." The press release said section 13 of the Canadian Human Rights Act was repealed in 2013. The press release noted that Section 13 had "made it a discriminatory practice for a person or a group of persons to communicate by telephone, by a telecommunication undertaking, or by means of a computer, including the Internet, any matter that is likely to expose a person or persons to hatred or contempt by reason of the fact that that person or those persons are identifiable on the basis of a prohibited ground of discrimination.

The study was undertaken shortly after New Zealand's March 15, 2019 Christchurch mosque shootings in which two terrorist attacks resulted in the death of 51 people. The perpetrator was described in media reports as a far-right extremism who was part of the alt-right and whose manifesto revealed his obsession with white supremacy over Muslims.

In May 2019, Prime Minister Justin Trudeau participated in meetings in Paris in which representatives from social media companies met with government leaders to "discuss solutions to the growing problem of violent extremist content online".

In mid-April Conservative MPs invited Jordan Peterson, a tenured professor at the University of Toronto, to appear before the committee as a witness. In mid-May, when NDP members criticized the invitation, one of the committee's vice-chairs, Conservative MP Michael Cooper, said that a "committee invitation does not mean the party approves of everything the speaker says." Cooper said that Peterson is a "massively popular best-selling author" as well as a tenured professor.

In June 2019, during his appearance before the committee as a witness, Faisal Khan Suri, the president of the Alberta Muslim Public Affairs Council, (AMPAC) referred to both the 2017 Quebec City mosque shooting (Note: In what Prime Minister Justin Trudeau described as a terrorist attack, six people and were killed and 19 others were wounded, after end of evening prayers in the Islamic Cultural Centre of Quebec City, in Sainte-Foy, Quebec City. The perpetrator was charged with six counts of first-degree murder.) and the March 15, 2019 Christchurch mosque shootings.

In his response to Suri's remarks, Cooper read a section from the New Zealand mosque shooter's manifesto into the Committee record. Following criticism about Cooper reading from the shooter's manifesto during the hearing and for confronting Suri, a Committee witness in a manner that was considered offensive, Cooper apologized. Conservative party leader Andrew Scheer removed Cooper from the committee. The quote was expunged from the committee's records. (Note: The manifesto has been banned in New Zealand.) Suri called for Cooper's removal from the Conservative caucus. On June 4, JUST witnesses included free speech activists Mark Steyn, John Robson and Lindsay Shepherd.

Provisions in the federal Criminal Code include hate speech laws.

== Membership ==
As of the 45th Canadian Parliament:

Party	Member	Riding
Liberal	James Maloney, chair	Etobicoke—Lakeshore, ON
Conservative	Larry Brock, vice chair	Brantford—Brant South—Six Nations, ON
Bloc Québécois	Rhéal Fortin, vice chair	Rivière-du-Nord, QC
Conservative	Roman Baber	York Centre, ON
Liberal	Wade Chang	Burnaby Central, BC
Liberal	Anju Dhillon	Dorval—Lachine—LaSalle, QC
Conservative	Amarjeet Gill	Brampton West, ON
Liberal	Anthony Housefather	Mount Royal, QC
Liberal	Patricia Lattanzio	Saint-Léonard—Saint-Michel, QC
Conservative	Andrew Lawton	Elgin—St. Thomas—London South, ON

== Subcommittees ==
- Subcommittee on Agenda and Procedure of the Standing Committee on Justice and Human Rights (SJUS)
