= Mario Dion =

Canadian public servant

2nd Conflict of Interest and Ethics Commissioner of Canada
- In office January 9, 2018 – February 21, 2023
- Preceded by: Mary Dawson
- Succeeded by: Martine Richard (interim)

2nd Public Sector Integrity Commissioner
- In office 2011–2014
- Preceded by: Christiane Ouimet
- Succeeded by: Joe Friday

Personal details
- Born: 1956 (age 69–70) Montreal, Quebec, Canada
- Occupation: Civil servant, lawyer

Mario Dion (born c. 1956) is a Canadian public servant who served as the second conflict of interest and ethics commissioner of Canada. He was appointed on January 9, 2018, succeeding Mary Dawson to a seven-year term. In February 2023, he resigned due to persistent health issues.

== Early life and education ==
Dion was born in Montreal. In 1979, Dion received a law degree from the University of Ottawa.

== Career ==
Dion began his legal career as a legal advisor in the Department of the Solicitor General (now Public Safety Canada) in 1980. In 1988, he was appointed an assistant deputy minister at Corrections Canada. He moved on to serve in the Department of Justice, in an assistant deputy minister, then associate deputy minister position. Dion also served in the Privy Council Office as deputy clerk and counsel from 1996 to 1997, and at the Department of Indian and Northern Affairs in 2003. Dion served as chair of the National Parole Board from 2006 to 2009, commissioner of public sector integrity from 2011 to 2014, and chair of the Immigration and Refugee Board from 2015 to 2018.

=== Public Sector Integrity Commissioner ===
In 2014, Michael Ferguson, Canada's former auditor general, publicly rebuked Dion's performance as the public sector integrity commissioner of Canada, an office that is supposed to protect public servants who blow the whistle on wrongdoing within the federal government. Dion was appointed commissioner by the Harper government after the previous commissioner resigned amid complaints about the office.

=== Ethics Commissioner ===
On December 11, 2017, Bardish Chagger, the leader of the Government in the House of Commons, announced the nomination of Dion as ethics commissioner, succeeding Mary Dawson. He assumed the role on January 9, 2018. Dion's rapid last-minute appointment by the Liberal Party was criticized for its secrecy.

As commissioner, Dion is responsible for administering the Conflict of Interest Act and the Conflict of Interest Code for Members of the House of Commons.

==== SNC-Lavalin affair ====
On February 11, 2019, Dion's office announced that it would investigate allegations of political interference and obstruction of justice by personnel in the Prime Minister's Office (dubbed the "SNC-Lavalin affair"), who allegedly attempted to pressure Jody Wilson-Raybould, the then minister of justice and attorney general, to intervene in an ongoing criminal prosecution case against construction firm SNC-Lavalin by granting them a deferred prosecution agreement.

In a letter to opposition New Democratic members of Parliament Charlie Angus and Nathan Cullen, Dion stated that he believed section 9 of the Conflict of Interest Act, which he stated "prohibits a public office holder from seeking to influence a decision of another person so as to improperly further another person’s private interests," had been breached, granting him the authority to investigate the matter.

==== We Charity affair ====
In 2021, he blamed Morneau but exonerated Trudeau in the WE Charity scandal where Margaret Trudeau was employed by this organisation but Trudeau had recused himself from the commission.

==== Leave of absence ====
On March 12, 2019, Dion announced that he will take a "prolonged" absence from his role as the government's conflict of interest watchdog, due to "medical reasons." His office's work continued in his absence, and he returned to work in April 2019.

==== Retirement ====
On February 14, 2023, Dion announced that he would retire from his post, given persistent health issues. His last day in office was February 21, 2023. At the time of his resignation, he had two years left in his seven year term.
