= Martine Richard =

Canadian public servant

Interim Conflict of Interest and Ethics Commissioner of Canada
- In office 27 March 2023 – 19 April 2023
- Preceded by: Mario Dion

Personal details
- Relatives: Dominic Leblanc (brother-in-law)
- Occupation: Civil servant

Martine Richard is a Canadian public servant who served as the interim conflict of interest and ethics commissioner of Canada. She was appointed on 27 March 2023, succeeding Mario Dion. Richard's appointment was intended to be interim for a six-month period, until a regular appointment was made, but she resigned several weeks after the appointment.

In the days after her appointment, opposition parties criticized her appointment to the role, due to her perceived closeness to the government. She is Dominic LeBlanc's sister-in-law.

Prior to her appointment as interim commissioner, Richard worked in the commissioner's office since 2013, having served as a senior legal adviser and investigator since 2015. During investigations into the SNC-Lavalin affair, she recused herself from at least two investigations due to perceived conflict of interest. In 2018, Richard also recused herself from an investigation of LeBlanc in which he was found to have violated the Conflict of Interest Act for awarding a lucrative fishing licence to a company linked to his wife's cousin.

On 18 April 2023, a motion was passed at the House of Commons Standing Committee on Access to Information, Privacy and Ethics to review the appointment and require Richard and LeBlanc to testify. The following day, Richard resigned as ethics commissioner, returning to her previous role as a lawyer in the ethics commissioner's office.
