= Mary Dawson (civil servant) =

Canadian lawyer and civil servant (1942–2023)

Mary Dawson CM KC

1st Conflict of Interest and Ethics Commissioner of Canada
- In office July 9, 2007 – January 9, 2018
- Preceded by: Office established
- Succeeded by: Mario Dion

Personal details
- Born: Mary Elizabeth Dawson; June 23, 1942 Halifax, Nova Scotia, Canada
- Died: December 24, 2023 (aged 81) Ottawa, Ontario, Canada
- Education: McGill University; Dalhousie University; University of Ottawa
- Occupation: Civil servant, lawyer

Mary Elizabeth Dawson CM KC (June 23, 1942 – December 24, 2023) was a Canadian lawyer and civil servant who was the Conflict of Interest and Ethics Commissioner of Canada. She was appointed under the Parliament of Canada Act on July 9, 2007 as the Conflict of Interest Act came into force until her term of office came to an end on January 8, 2018.

== Early life and education ==
Dawson was born in Halifax, Nova Scotia, and moved to Toronto, Ontario, at age 11. She graduated with a Bachelor of Civil Law from McGill University in 1966. She then graduated from Dalhousie University with a Bachelor of Laws in 1970. She also earned a Diplôme d’études supérieures en droit (droit public) from the University of Ottawa. She was a member of the Nova Scotia Barristers' Society and the Law Society of Ontario while also retaining her membership in her original Bar, the Bar of Quebec, until her retirement from the Department of Justice.

== Career ==
Dawson joined the Legislation Section of the Department of Justice in 1970 and drafted such laws as the Access to Information Act, the Privacy Act, the Canada Health Act, the Official Languages Act, the Competition Act, the Customs Act and the Young Offenders Act. Dawson was made a Queen's Counsel in 1978.

Dawson was associate chief legislative counsel from 1980 to 1986 and chair of the Statute Revision Commission through most of the 1980s.

From 1986 to 1995, Dawson was the head of the Department of Justice Public Law Sector, including the traditional public law areas of constitutional law, administrative law and international law as well as human rights law, indigenous law, judicial affairs, access and privacy law and regulatory affairs.

Dawson had a long career with the Government of Canada and oversaw a wide variety of legal issues from within the Department of Justice. She retired in 2005 as associate deputy minister, a position she had held since 1988.

Dawson played an important role in relation to constitutional matters. She was the final drafter for the patriation package (Constitution Act, 1982) and, until her retirement, drafted, and was the principal legal adviser for, all constitutional amendments, including the Meech Lake Accord and the Charlottetown Accord. She led the legal team for the Government of Canada on the Quebec Secession Reference and was responsible for the legal advice on, and drafting of, the Clarity Act. Dawson also managed the Supreme Court Reference on same-sex marriage for the Government of Canada as well as the preparation of the related legislation. She advised extensively in the area of aboriginal rights.

Dawson was a Skelton-Clark Fellow at Queen's University in the 1999–2000 academic year, where she lectured in several faculties. She also published several articles on various subjects.

Dawson retired from the Department of Justice in 2005. After her retirement, Dawson acted as a consultant on a variety of projects, in both the public and private sectors. In June 2006, she was appointed to the Board of Governors of the Ottawa Hospital, and served on a number of board committees. In 2014 she joined the Board of Help Lesotho.

Dawson was also involved in a number of international activities, as well as various outreach activities in Canada. She held executive positions in the International Bar Association and was a Canadian member of the Joint Steering Committee of the Joint Canada-Russia project on Public Administration Reform in Russia.

Dawson was named a Member of the Order of Canada in 2007.

== Justin Trudeau ==
Justin Trudeau's vacation visit to Bell Island in December 2016 and concomitant helicopter ride on a private aircraft controlled by the Aga Khan raised an investigation by Dawson, insofar as Canadian government ethics rules prohibit a prime minister or cabinet minister from accepting travel on a private aircraft unless prior Ethics Commission clearance is secured. The Ethics Commission determined that Trudeau's, or his wife and children's, vacations to Bell Island in December 2014, March 2016, and December 26, 2016 to January 4, 2017, "could reasonably be seen to have been given to influence Mr. Trudeau in his capacity as prime minister." Trudeau apologized for these violations of federal laws.

== Death ==
Dawson died of a rare type of thyroid cancer on December 24, 2023, at the age of 81.

Preceded by Position created - replacing Ethics Commissioner Bernard Shapiro	Conflict of Interest and Ethics Commissioner of Canada; 2007–2018	Succeeded by Mario Dion
