= Camille Dagenais =

Canadian engineer

- Born: November 12, 1920; Montreal, Quebec, Canada
- Died: September 18, 2016 (aged 95)
- Occupation(s): engineer, executive

Camille A. Dagenais, CC OQ (November 12, 1920 – September 18, 2016) was a Canadian engineer and former President of the SNC Group.

Dagenais was born in Montreal in 1920. In 1972 he was made an Officer of the Order of Canada and was promoted to Companion in 1982. In 1979 he received an honorary doctorate from Concordia University. In 2010 he was made an Officer of the National Order of Quebec. He died at the age of 95 in 2016.
