= AtkinsRéalis =

Canada-based engineering company

AtkinsRéalis Group Inc.
- Trade name: AtkinsRéalis
- Type: Public
- Traded as: TSX: ATRL; S&P/TSX 60 component
- Industry: Engineering, construction, airports, building services, electrical grids, environmental protection & remediation, hydroelectricity, manufacturing, metallurgy, mining, nuclear power, ports, rail transport, roads, water & wastewater
- Founded: 1911; 115 years ago
- Founder: Arthur Surveyer
- Headquarters: Montreal, Quebec, Canada
- Key people: Ian L. Edwards; (President and CEO); William L. Young; (Chair of the Board); Jeff Bell; (Executive vice president and CFO)
- Products: Engineering services, project management, construction, construction management, procurement and operations and maintenance
- Revenue: ▲CA$8.6 billion (2023)
- Net income: ▲CA$287.2 million (2023)
- Number of employees: 37000 (2023)
- Website: atkinsrealis.com

AtkinsRéalis Group Inc., formerly known as SNC-Lavalin Group Inc., (Note: The former SNC-Lavalin adopted the trading name AtkinsRéalis on September 12, 2023. It changed its legal name to reflect this rebranding on May 16, 2024.) is a Canadian company based in Montreal that provides engineering, procurement, and construction (EPC) services to various industries, including mining and metallurgy, environment and water, infrastructure, and clean energy. AtkinsRéalis was the largest construction company, by revenue, in Canada, as of 2021.

The firm has approximately 37,000 employees worldwide, with offices in over 50 countries and operations in over 160 countries.

== Key sectors ==
The company's key service sectors are buildings, defence, mining, electrical power, transportation, and water; each sector offers services that includes design, studies, consultancy, financing, asset management, engineering, construction, procurement and operations and maintenance. Operations include mass transit and heavy rail systems, highways, bridges, airports and marine facilities, as well as industrial, commercial, cultural and healthcare buildings. Mining and metallurgy sector offers services to green fields and brown fields projects of any sizes or complexity including "mining commodities, fertilizers, and sulphuric acid facilities". Its power sector provides services in environment and water, the transmission and distribution of energy, hydropower, nuclear power, renewables and thermal power generation, energy from waste, electrical power delivery systems", and "clean and sustainable power technologies".

== History ==
Former SNC-Lavalin logo

=== SNC (1911–1991) ===
In 1911, Arthur Surveyer established a consulting engineering office, Arthur Surveyer & Cie., in Montréal after completing studies in Belgium and at Polytechnique Montréal and working for several years with public works. Against the backdrop of the transformative advances in electrification. Surveyer worked on hydropower projects with his partner, Augustin Frigon (1888–1952), an engineer, professor, and Director at Polytechnique Montréal (Note: Augustin Frigon (1888–1952) was an engineer, professor and Director at the Polytechnique Montréal. He also served as Director of Société Radio-Canada from 1944 à 1952.) where Surveyer had earned his degree. In 1912, they worked on a power distribution network for the city of Grand-Mère on Saint-Maurice River. The project that increased the company's profile was the Saint-Maurice River hydroelectric power station, which they designed and supervised. The company specialized in hydraulics, managing hydropower projects and flood control, and soon branched out into the industrial sector, particularly in pulp and paper, and mining and metallurgy.

Surveyer formed a first 10-year partnership with Emil Nenniger and Georges Chênevert in 1937. A second partnership agreement was signed in 1946, and the firm's name was changed to Surveyer, Nenniger and Chênevert. The name would eventually be abbreviated to SNC.

In 1967 Camille A. Dagenais OC, became president and CEO of SNC Group, a position he held until 1975. When Dagenais was inducted into the Order of Canada, he was honoured for his accomplishments at SNC—specifically for large-scale hydro development projects in Canada and internationally, for example, in India and Greece. One of the most important projects was the work he oversaw on the recently nationalized (Note: According to historian Paul-André Linteau, in his 1989 publication Histoire du Québec contemporain – Volume 2: Le Québec depuis 1930, when Hydro-Québec was nationalized it became a symbol of the "new Quebec nationalism and of the new economic strategy of the State". The construction of the Daniel-Johnson Dam and the Manic-Outardes complex had a greater symbolic impact as it was part of the "larger social and political context of the Quiet Revolution in Quebec.) Hydro-Québec's Manic-5 project (1959–1970) on the Manicouagan River, north of Baie-Comeau. It was built for hydroelectric power production and supplies water to the Manic-5s power houses. The firm's first international contract was awarded in 1963, to design and build the 780 MW Idukki power station in Kerala State, India.

=== Lavalin (1936–1991) ===
SNC's main rival in Canada was Lalonde, Valois International Limited, a company that was established in 1936 by engineers Jean-Paul Lalonde and Romeo Valois. Bernard Lamarre, who would later become director and CEO in 1962 and lead Lavalin for 29 years, had married Louise Lalonde, Jean-Paul Lalonde's daughter in 1952, and began working at Lalonde, Valois International Limited. In 1972, the company changed its name to Lavalin—combining syllables from the original company name. In the 1970s, Lavalin designed and built the fabric roof for Montreal's Olympic Stadium and built the James Bay Project, in a partnership with the United-States-based Bechtel.

According to a 1986 Maclean's article by Anthony Wilson-Smith, Lavalin was Canada's "largest engineering firm, with $625 million in operating revenues in 1985 and 5,700 employees. SNC was the second largest". Wilson-Smith also said that they were "among the largest engineering firms in the world". Lavalin branched out in other industries, such as cable television—Canada's The Weather Network and MétéoMédia were founded by Lavalin in 1988. Lavalin's shares were sold to Pelmorex in 1993. By 1990 Lavalin Inc included over 70 companies worth CA$1.2 billion. It was forced to sell to its rival SNC in 1991.

=== SNC-Lavalin (1991–2023) ===
Bernard Lamarre remained with the newly formed company, SNC-Lavalin until 1999. He oversaw major projects including the TransCanada highway in Montreal, the Louis-Hippolyte-Lafontaine Bridge-Tunnel, the Olympic Stadium in Montréal, and Alcan in the Ville de La Baie. He also oversaw projects in Benin and in Algeria.

Bernard Lamarre's younger brother, Jacques Lamarre, a civil engineer, became SNC-Lavalin's CEO in 1996 and left his post in 2009.

==== Acquisitions and partnerships ====
According to Ingram, SNC-Lavalin partnered with Bombardier in the 1990s to build transportation projects in Malaysia and Turkey. SNC-Lavalin acquired a 27% share in Ontario's Highway 407 toll road for $175 million. In 2011, SNC-Lavalin sold part of its share of Highway 407, at a significant profit.

In June 2011, SNC-Lavalin purchased the commercial reactor division of Atomic Energy of Canada Limited (AECL) from the Government of Canada for CA$15 million. SNC-Lavalin established a subsidiary company named Candu Energy to market the design and supply of CANDU reactors.

On June 23, 2014, SNC-Lavalin acquired Irish engineering and construction business Kentz for approximately CA$2.1 billion (US$1.95 billion).

In 2017, SNC-Lavalin acquired its UK rival Atkins—a British design, engineering and project management consulting firm, for approximately CA$3.36 billion with $1.9-billion investment from the Caisse de dépôt et placement du Québec.

In late 2018, SNC-Lavalin agreed to form a joint venture with the Swedish-Swiss industrial giant ABB for the delivery of turnkey electrical substation projects. This new company, named Linxon, undertakes project design, engineering, procurement, and construction activities for a range of clients in the transport, utilities, and renewable electricity generation and transmission sectors.

In 2021 the company's oil & gas business, including the former Atkins and Kentz oil and gas businesses, was sold to Dubai-based Kentech Corporate Holdings. After the transaction was completed Kentech changed its name to Kent plc.

=== AtkinsRéalis (2023–present) ===
On September 13, 2023, SNC-Lavalin announced it was rebranding to become AtkinsRéalis. President and CEO Ian Edwards said the new name combined the Atkins legacy brand and 'Réalis, inspired by the city of Montréal and the company's French-Canadian roots. The new name also evoked the word 'realise', as in 'make happen'. The new name was used immediately on all communications materials and the Toronto Stock Exchange (new ticker symbol TSX: ATRL). The legal name switch received shareholder approval at the company's annual general meeting in 2024.

SNC-Lavalin sold the Scandinavian businesses of Atkins to French engineering firm SYSTRA for $102 million in 2023.

== Major domestic projects ==
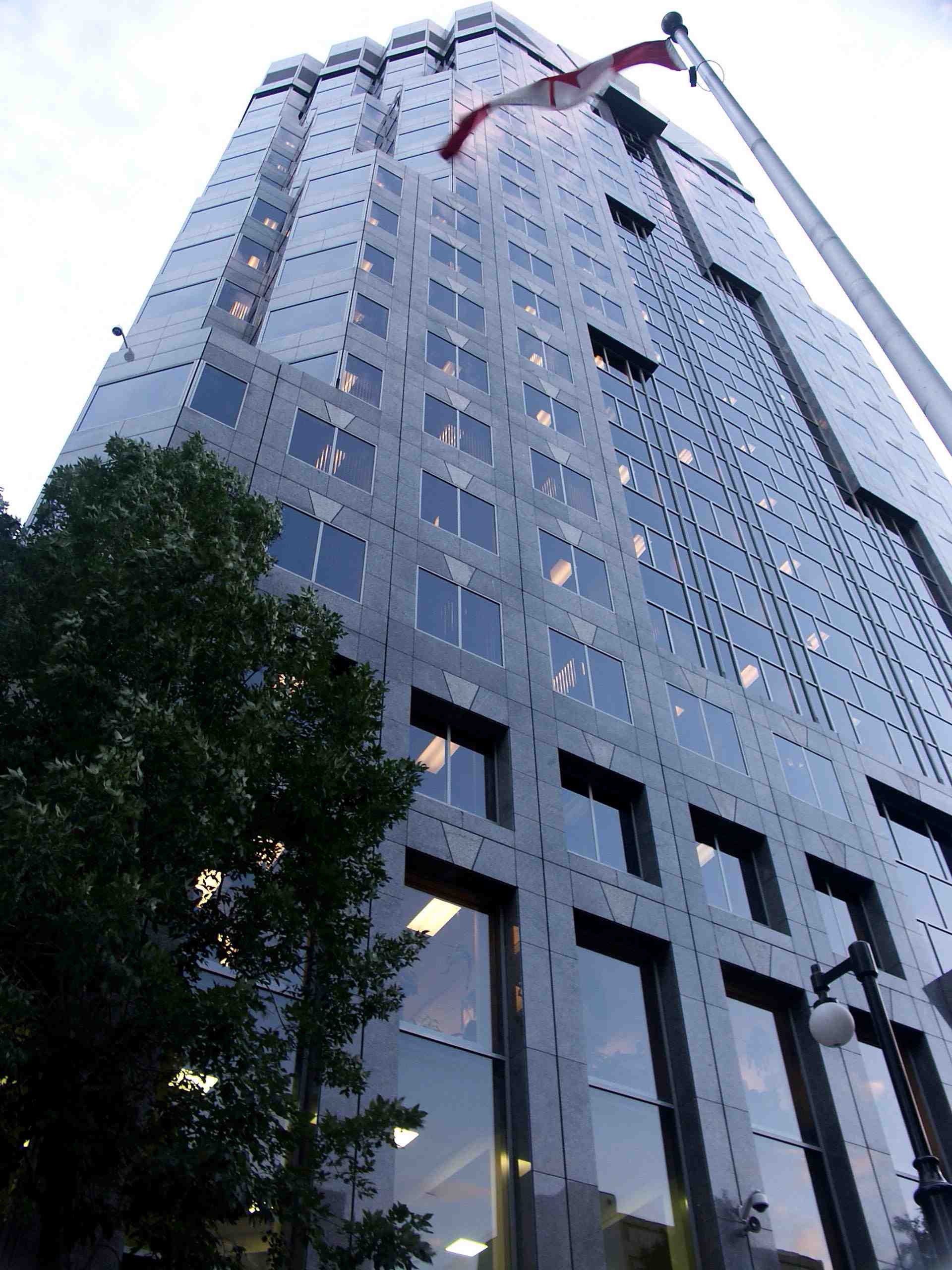
Corporate headquarters of SNC-Lavalin on René-Lévesque Blvd, in Montreal.

In 2000, the Ontario government signed a $3.1 billion 99-year lease for Ontario Highway 407 with 407 International Inc., a conglomerate of three private companies, including SNC-Lavalin. It was renamed 407 ETR. In the early 2000s, SNC-Lavalin won the contract to repair Montreal's Jacques Cartier Bridge.

In 2002–2003 the firm completed a feasibility study of the Lac Doré Vanadium Deposit, in which they established the deposit as the largest vanadium deposit in North America.

In 2005 SNC-Lavalin in partnership with Brun-Way Group, won the $543.8-million contract to build the Brun-way project to twin Route 2, the New Brunswick portion of the Trans-Canada Highway from Woodstock, New Brunswick to Fredericton. The contract with the New Brunswick government was completed in 2007. In June 2005, the BC Department of Transport selected SNC-Lavalin for a 30-year contract valued at $179 million to "design, build, finance and operate" the William R. Bennett Bridge in Kelowna, British Columbia. Construction which was completed in 2008.

In 2004, the firm was awarded the contract for Canada Line, an extension of the SkyTrain rapid-transit system in Vancouver; the project was completed in 2009, ahead of schedule.

The Goreway Power Station, an 869.8 megawatt gas-fired power generation facility in Brampton, Ontario, near Pearson Airport, constructed by way of an EPC agreement with SNC-Lavalin, began commercial operation in 2009, for Toyota Tsusho and Chubu Electric Power. The firm completed the construction of Ermine Power Station for SaskPower in Saskatchewan in 2009.

In 2010 the firm completed the construction of a $1.3 billion hospital at the McGill University Health Centre. (See discussion regarding controversy, below.)

The firm was awarded the 2015 Canadian Consulting Engineering Awards for its work in structural and civil engineering for the Halifax Central Library project in which they created a "civic landmark and centrepiece for the Capital District".

In 2015, the Eglinton Crosstown (LRT) and Blue22 (airport rail link) projects in Toronto were awarded to SNC-Lavalin, who was one of only two bidders for the Crosstown line. Both lines have since been transferred to Metrolinx ownership. The Crosstown line was due to be completed in 2020, but opened to the public after repeated delays on February 8, 2026 while Blue22 opened as Union Pearson Express in 2015.

AtkinsRéalis is one of three lead partners in the Rideau Transit Group (RTG) consortium, alongside ACS Group and EllisDon, responsible for the design and construction of the Confederation Line (Line 1), a 12.5-kilometre light-metro line in Ottawa featuring a 2.5-kilometre downtown subway tunnel. After missing several deadlines in 2018 and early 2019, the line officially opened to the public on September 14, 2019.

== International projects ==
In 1995, SNC-Lavalin won a large infrastructure contract to renovate and modernize hydro electric power stations with the Indian government.

In 2007, the firm won the $4.6-billion Ambatovy mine engineering, procurement, and construction (EPC) management contract, the largest capital project in Madagascar's history. It was completed in 2010. The nickel and cobalt mining and preparation plant was completed in 2010. SNC-Lavalin sold its share for $600 million. There has been controversy about the mine's environmental and health impacts.

In December 2016, the firm won a BOO (build–own–operate) (BOO) contract from Crestwood Equity Partners valued at $100 million for multiple gas facilities in the Permian shale basin in the United States. In March 2016, it was awarded an $800M EPC management contract for a Middle East gas processing project.

== Major investors ==
The Caisse de dépôt et placement du Québec is SNC-Lavalin's "long-term partner". According to an article by Pierre Fortin in L'actualité, Quebec Deposit and Investment Fund (the Caisse), which manages the Quebec Pension Plan and is the second largest pension fund in Canada, after the Canada Pension Plan (CPP), has increased its financing of Quebec enterprises from 2003 through 2013.

== Legal issues ==
SNC-Lavalin's management teams have been investigated in a number of allegations under the Corruption of Foreign Public Officials Act regarding contracts beginning with the SNC-Lavalin Kerala hydroelectric dam scandal (1995–2008) through to the allegations involving the bribing of Libyan officials between 2001 and 2011.

=== SNC-Lavalin Kerala hydroelectric dam scandal (1995–2008) ===
SNC-Lavalin won a large infrastructure contract to renovate and modernize hydroelectric power stations with the Current Chief Minister of Kerala Pinarayi Vijayan Indian government in 1995 which resulted in an alleged net loss to the Indian exchequer of 3745.0 million rupees, but led to no charges against the firm. SNC-Lavalin was subsequently accused of bribery and financial fraud related to the contract in 2008. A government investigation resulted in the expulsion of several Indian government officials.

=== Montreal's Jacques-Cartier bridge (early 2000s) ===
Former Federal Bridge Corporation CEO Michel Fournier was charged with taking $2.35 million in bribes from SNC-Lavalin in return for the contract to repair the Jacques Cartier Bridge in the early 2000s. Fournier pleaded guilty and sentenced in 2017 to five years for his part in the bribery scheme. The RCMP launched a subsequent investigation called Agrafe 2 into potential criminal charges against the company concerning the bridge contract. Two of the company's subsidiaries and two former executives, Normand Morin and Kamal Francis, were charged in September 2021. The prosecution encouraged the company to negotiate a plea deal, given the top management had completely changed since the offences had occurred. Bribery payments were made through a Lebanese intermediary to Fournier, and were disguised as fictitious work on projects in Algeria and Libya. In May 2022 the company negotiated a deferred prosecution agreement and agreed to pay fines, surcharges and victim compensation totalling $29.6 million to settle the matter.

=== Illegal reimbursement of political donations (2004–2011) ===
In 2016, commissioner of Canada elections was probing political party donations made by SNC-Lavalin employees. According to the source that provided information to CBC News, the investigation found that SNC-Lavalin reimbursed all of those individual donations—a practice forbidden under the Canada Elections Act—but Elections Canada reached an agreement with the company to avoid prosecution.

In May 2018, former SNC-Lavalin executive vice president Normand Morin was charged with making illegal donations to Canadian federal political parties, on recommendation from the director of public prosecutions, in the Court of Quebec. The charges allege that from 2004 to 2011, Morin orchestrated and solicited political donations from employees or their spouses to Canadian federal political parties anonymously on behalf of SNC-Lavalin, to be reimbursed afterwards. The amounts paid included about CA$110,000 to the Liberal Party and CA$8,000 to other Canadian political parties. In November 2018, Morin pleaded guilty to two of the five charges, and was fined $2,000. The remaining three charges were dropped by the prosecution.

=== Libya (2011) ===
A 2012 CBC News report, said that the first reports of murky affairs surfaced against the company in 2010 in relation to contracts in Libya. According to a CBC News article, a Libyan bribery and fraud scandal involving crimes that took place from 2001 to 2011 led to charges in "connection with payments of nearly $48 million" to Libyan public officials. In the same article, it was reported that the company was also accused of "defrauding Libyan organizations of an estimated $130 million".

In 2015, SNC-Lavalin was charged with bribing Libyan officials in exchange for construction contracts between 2001 and 2011. In 2011, the RCMP began an investigation called Project Assistance which was triggered by a tip from Swiss authorities. According to an August 16, 2013 Financial Post article, Michael Novak, who had been the head of SNC International, had "signed several of the contracts between SNC and commercial consultants for work in Africa" having declared that "he believed he was dealing with veritable consultants" and having been later cleared of any wrongdoing by investigators, as reported by La Presse. This included a contract with former Libyan dictator Muammar Gaddafi's controversial government. By the summer of 2013, police alleged that the "unknown commercial consultants" had never existed and that Ben Aissa had "set up shell companies so he could pocket the [$56 million] himself". By July 2014, Aissa was jailed in Switzerland for "suspicion of corruption, fraud and money-laundering in North Africa". (Note: According to a CBC News report, Ben Aïssa, was "known for his intimate ties to two of Gadhafi's sons". He "oversaw a SNC military-civilian engineering unit project with its first phase—a $271 million prison—created by SNL with the Gadhafi government that hired Edis Zagorac, Sandra McCardell's husband. McCardell was formerly Canada's ambassador to Libya. The project "also hired Canada's former ambassador to Tunisia, Bruno Picard." According to a February 23, 2012 CBC News report, "SNC-Lavalin's billions of dollars worth in contracts with Libya, [were] procured by Riadh Ben Aïssa, the executive vice president in charge of construction." According to an October 1, 2014 CBC News article, Aïssa served 29 months in prison in Switzerland before his extradition to Canada to face further charges. According to a July 10, 2018 CBC News article, Riadh Ben Aïssa "pleaded guilty to one charge of using a forged document at the Montreal courthouse". In "exchange for the plea, 15 other charges against him were dropped.") When SNC-Lavalin pulled out of Libya in 2011, it left behind $22.9 million in Libyan banks. In 2013, Roy filed a countersuit for wrongful dismissal, claiming lost wages and damages to his reputation, alleging that he had been framed and scapegoated by higher-level executives whose directives he was obliged to follow. (Note: By February 13, 2013, Stéphane Roy, "a former SNC controller filed a lawsuit against SNC for "wrongful dismissal claiming he was only following SNC's "corporate culture." In 2014 he was charged with "fraud, bribing a foreign official and violating United Nations sanctions against Libya in connection with SNC-Lavalin's operations in that country."] In February 2019, sixty months after the original charges were made, Judge Patricia Compagnone, ruled that based on the Jordan ruling, Roy's right to a speedy trial had been violated and she therefore acquitted him of all charges.)

By February 2012, SNC-Lavalin investors had found out that audited financial statements had been delayed to accommodate an internal review relating to SNC-Lavalin's operations. The internal review probed $35 million of unexplained payments in Libya. Prior to the launch of the investigation, there had been months-long media speculation about the company's work in Libya and its ties to the Muammar Gaddafi family. In 2012, the RCMP investigated the company on these charges in the Project Assistance investigation and, in 2015, they charged SNC-Lavalin with "fraud and corruption", which the company indicated they would contest in court.

On December 18, 2019, SNC-Lavalin Construction Inc. pleaded guilty to fraud contrary to section 380(1) a) of the Canadian Criminal Code. The company stated that, between 2001 and 2011, over $47.5 million had been paid to Al-Saadi Gaddafi. The money was directed through two representative companies, both listing Riadh Ben Aissa as the sole beneficial owner. In return for the bribes, Al-Saadi Gaddafi applied his influence to the construction contract bidding process, ensuring contracts were awarded to SNC-Lavalin Construction. Payments of personal benefits totalling over $73.5 million were also made through the representative companies to Ben Aissa and Sami Bebawi, a former vice-president of SLCI. As part of its plea agreement with the Public Prosecution Service, SLCI was fined $280 million and given a three-year probation order. In exchange, the remaining corruption and fraud charges against SNC-Lavalin Group Inc., SNC-Lavalin Construction Inc. and SNC-Lavalin International Inc. were stayed.

After the bribes were discovered, the audit committee of the company's board launched an investigation into the matter, led by directors such as Claude Mongeau, then the CEO at Canadian National Railway. During the audit committee investigation, the Financial Post wrote a story critical of full-time CEOs serving on the boards of directors of other companies, calling out Mongeau specifically.

=== McGill University; the Arthur Porter kick-back scandal (2011–2014) ===
Charges were laid against senior executives from 2014 through 2019 in the bribery cases involving Arthur Porter at the McGill University Health Centre. According to a 2012 article in the Globe & Mail, these reports prompted calls for Canada to tighten bribery laws.

According to the National Post, SNC-Lavalin employees allegedly were involved in fraud and forgery in relation to a $22.5 million kick-back described as "consulting fees" to Arthur Porter (Note: According to a February 1, 2019 CTV News article, Yanai Elbaz, a former MUHC senior manager, was Arthur Porter's "right-hand man in regards to the "$22.5-million in bribes. According to a June 26, 2013 article in The Star, in the spring of 2013, an audit of SNC-Lavalin's European headquarters in France uncovered a $13.5-million payment that was made to look like it was tied to a Middle East gas-plant project" but it was actually paid to a company run by the Porter. In 2013, SNC-Lavalin said that the $13.5M was a portion of the $56 million in improper payments that led to the dismissal in 2012 of former CEO Pierre Duhaime and Riadh Ben Aissa, then executive vice-president of construction.) on the contract to build the new $1.3 billion hospital at the McGill University Health Centre's CEO in violation of the Quebec Health Act. SNC-Lavalin were awarded the contract even though they were outbid by $60 million. The case led to an investigation by the Charbonneau Commission. Porter resigned from the post on December 5, 2011, in light of substantial public pressure. Porter was arrested in Panama on fraud charges on May 27, 2013, which alleged that he took part in the kick-back scheme. The CBC called it the biggest fraud investigation in Canadian history. SNC-Lavalin CEO, Pierre Duhaime in March 2012, was arrested on fraud charges by Quebec authorities on November 28, 2012. (Note: Former SNC-Lavalin CEO Pierre Duhaime resigned in the last week of March 2012 with $4.97-million in various departure payments according to an April 3, 2012 Financial Post article. He was arrested by Quebec authorities on November 28, 2012. According to a February 1, 2019 CTV News article by Pierre Saint-Arnaud, in February 2019, Duhaime pleaded guilty to a single charge in connection with the major corruption and fraud case involving SNC-Lavalin's contract to construct a new $1.3-billion hospital at the University Health Centre. He was the last defendant in the case. He faced "16 charges including fraud, conspiracy to commit fraud, using forged documents and breach of trust.") (Note: According to a CBC article, in another case stemming from this Project Assistance investigation, Quebec Superior Court Justice Guy Cournoyer stayed obstruction of justice charges against former SNC-Lavalin vice-president Sami Bebawi and his lawyer Constantine Kyres, on February 15 citing unreasonable delays. Kyres was originally arrested in January 2014. In 2018, a judge ruled that the RCMP had illegally obtained evidence in this case. Bebawi still faces "several other charges related to contracts negotiated with Moammar Gadhafi's Libyan regime.")

SNC-Lavalin sued Duhaime for millions of dollars in damages, claiming that he stained its goodwill by means of the McGill University Health Centre superhospital scandal. The company claims that Duhaime "facilitated the execution of the embezzlement" of $22.5 million of company funds. Duhaime was charged with several counts related to the bribe. In February 2019 he pleaded guilty to one count of breach of trust. The prosecution vacated some 15 further charges.

=== Padma Bridge (since 2011) ===
An investigation into an alleged graft related to 2011 bids for the construction of the 6.51 kilometre (four-mile) USD$3 billion road—rail bridge crossing the Padma River in Bangladesh, resulted in the former SNC-Lavalin employees being cleared of all charges by a Canadian court. In May 2011, two former SNC-Lavalin International Inc. (SLII) employees Ramesh Shah and Mohammad Ismail met government officials in Bangladesh to discuss a bid for the $50-million supervision contract to build the Padma Bridge, a project estimated to be worth US$3 billion. Part of the allegations were related to SLII common practice of list project consultancy costs (PCC), also known as project commercial cost, as a line item in internal budgets documents related to the bidding process. (Note: According to a May 15, 2013 CBC News report, SNC-Lavalin International Inc. (SLII) "focused on smaller contracts to design and supervise megaprojects". According to former SLII engineer, Mohammad Ismail, it was a common practice for SLII to list project consultancy costs (PCC) also known as project commercial cost, as a line item in internal budgets documents in regards to contracts with countries such as, including Kazakhstan, Cambodia (2013), Uganda, Malawi, Zambia, Mozambique, Nigeria, and Ghana, to facilitate bids on contracts. These PCCs or CCs were flagged in audits as potential bribes.) As a result of the original investigation by World Bank investigators who worked with RCMP officers, in September 2013, the World Bank blacklisted SNC-Lavalin and its affiliates from bidding on the World Bank's global projects. The World Bank had originally offered to fund $1.5 billion of the $3 billion but pulled back following the allegations. However, on February 11, 2017, the Ontario Superior Court found no proof of the Padma bridge bribery conspiracy, dismissed the case, and acquitted the ex-SNC-Lavalin executives. According to the Dhaka Tribune, Justice Ian Nordheimer rebuked the Canadian police, saying: "Reduced to its essentials, the information provided in the [wiretap applications] was nothing more than speculation, gossip, and rumor."

=== SaskPower serious design flaws (2015) ===
In 2015, internal documents from SaskPower (the crown corporation that is the principal electric utility in Saskatchewan, Canada), revealed that there were "serious design issues" in the carbon capture and storage system at its coal-fired Boundary Dam Power Station, resulting in regular breakdowns and maintenance problems that caused the unit to be operational only 40% of the time. SNC-Lavalin had been contracted to engineer, procure, and build the facility, and the documents asserted that it "has neither the will or the ability to fix some of these fundamental flaws". The low productivity of the plant had in turn meant that SaskPower was only able to sell half of the 800,000 tonnes of captured carbon dioxide that it had contracted to sell to Cenovus Energy for use in enhanced oil recovery at a cost of $25 per tonne. In addition to the lost sales, this meant that SaskPower had been forced to pay Cenovus $12 million in penalties. In 2017, Cenovus sold its Saskatchewan operations to Whitecap Resources. By September 2018, "SaskPower and SNC-Lavalin had completed mediation and were headed to binding arbitration". In July 2018, SaskPower announced, in its annual report, that they would not be proceeding with retrofitting the two aging facilities near Estevan—Boundary Dams 4 and 5 (BD4 and BD5) with carbon capture and storage (CCS). According to a February 11, 2019 CBC News article, SNC-Lavalin has "received about $765,800,000 in [Saskatchewan provincial] government contracts from 2009 to 2018".

=== SNC-Lavalin affair (2019) ===
Following a 2017 public consultation process, the Government of Canada moved forward with the establishment of a "made-in-Canada version of a deferred prosecution agreement (DPA) regime", called the "Remediation Agreement Regime", which was introduced in the March budget and came into effect in June 2018. (Note: The Government of Canada held a consultation period in 2017 regarding the implementation of a deferred prosecution agreement similar to one used in the United Kingdom. The report of the consultation showed that the majority approved of a DPA. SNC-Lavalin's lawyers began a process to request a DPA in April 2018, one of the first companies to do so. The government enhanced the 2015 Integrity Regime with the addition of a made-in-Canada deferred prosecution agreement (DPA) called a "Remediation Agreement Regime" which was enacted in June 2018 through provisions in the omnibus budget implementation Bill C-74, that amended the Criminal Code.) By 2019, SNC-Lavalin, still facing criminal charges in regard to several contracts, began investigating the possibility of a DPA under the newly introduced Remediation Agreement Regime, as early as April 2018. On February 10, 2019, the Toronto Star reported that Opposition Leader Andrew Scheer met with SNC-Lavalin CEO Neil Bruce on May 29, 2018, to discuss the remediation agreement. The director of public prosecutions informed SNC-Lavalin on October 9, that its DPA option was rejected because "is not appropriate in this case". According to the National Post, "If the company is convicted it would be barred from bidding on federal contracts for 10 years, potentially costing it billions in forgone revenue." In response, the company's share prices dropped, leaving it vulnerable to a hostile takeover. According to the Montreal Gazette, Quebec Premier François Legault said that SNC-Lavalin was one of ten publicly traded companies headquartered in Quebec that the province considers to be "strategic" and therefore in need of protection from a takeover that would force the company to leave the province.

On February 8, 2019, the Globe & Mail reported that sources close to the government said that the Prime Minister's Office allegedly had attempted to influence Jody Wilson-Raybould's decision concerning SNC-Lavalin's request for a DPA, while she was Minister of Justice and Attorney General. When asked about the allegations, Justin Trudeau said that the story in the Globe was false and that he had never "directed" Wilson-Raybould concerning the case. Wilson-Raybould refused to comment on the matter citing solicitor-client privilege. Under pressure from the Conservative Party of Canada and the New Democratic Party (NDP), on February 11, 2019, the conflict of interest and ethics commissioner launched an inquiry into allegations of political interference and a possible violation of the Conflict of Interest Act in the SNC-Lavalin case.

On February 18, 2019, Gerald Butts, Trudeau's principal secretary, resigned and denied that he or anyone else in the Prime Minister's Office attempted to influence Wilson-Raybould.

On February 27, 2019, Wilson-Raybould spoke about the SNC-Lavalin controversy at a hearing of the House of Commons justice committee. In her first substantial public statement on the matter, she testified that she was inappropriately pressured to prevent the Montreal-based company from being prosecuted in a bribery case.

On August 14, 2019, Mario Dion, conflict of interest and ethics commissioner, released a report that said Trudeau contravened section 9 of the Conflict of Interest Act by improperly pressuring Wilson-Raybould. The report details lobbying efforts by SNC-Lavalin to influence prosecution since at least February 2016, including the lobbying efforts to enact DPA legislation. The commissioner has also found that Trudeau acted improperly when using his position of authority over Wilson-Raybould in an effort to have her overrule the director of public prosecution's decision not to negotiate a deal with SNC-Lavalin that would see the company avoid criminal prosecution over charges of corruption and fraud stemming from an RCMP investigation. The report analyses SNC-Lavalin's interests and finds that the lobbying effort advanced private interests of the company, rather than public interests. The report's analysis section discusses the topics of prosecutorial independence and Shawcross doctrine (dual role of Attorney General) to draw the conclusion that the influence was improper and a violation of Conflict of Interest Act.

=== Company responses ===
SNC-Lavalin CEO Pierre Duhaime resigned in March 2012 and was arrested by Quebec's anti-corruption squad on charges including fraud on November 28, 2012. He was replaced by Ian A. Bourne, who was also the chairman of Ballard Power Systems and a member of the CPP Investment Board. Bourne sat on SNC-Lavalin's board of directors beginning in 2009, before the "allegations of fraud and corruption in Libya" were made. As interim CEO from May 2012 to October 2012, Bourne oversaw a "major overhaul" of SNC-Lavalin's culture. Bourne resigned as chairman and as a director in March 2015 and was replaced by Lawrence N. Stevenson, who sat on SNC's board from 1999 until 2018.

Just before retiring from SNC-Lavalin in May 2012, Gwyn Morgan—who had been chair since 2006—hired American civil and environmental engineer Robert Card as CEO. Card was instructed to revamp the company's "ethics and compliance standards" and oversee the departure of existing management that had been involved in the scandals. During this period, over 10,000 Canadian employees left the company, many of them voluntarily. By 2013, when Card had completed his "strategic offensive" against previous SNC-Lavalin management, Neil Bruce, a native of Scotland, replaced Card. By August, four senior executives had departed, including Gilles Laramée, former CFO, Ric Sorbo, former head of SNC's oil and gas business, Patrick Lamarre, head of the power unit, and Michael Novak. SNC-Lavalin also dismissed financial controller Stéphane Roy.

Bruce undertook a campaign to improve ethics and compliance at all levels of the company management. This included using Transparency International's corruption rankings as a guideline in deciding which countries with which SNC-Lavalin would do business. In June 2019 Bruce retired from the company.

In 2019, the investigations continued to affect the company and its CEO Bruce. SNC-Lavalin continued to face criminal charges in 2019 in regards to alleged bribes contracts between 2001 and 2011. The company failed to receive a remediation agreement that would have provided a reprieve from criminal charges and now faces a potential conviction. A new investigation involving potential bribery in relation to a repair contract in the early 2000s, has been reported by La Presse.
