= Bernard Shapiro =

Canadian academic (born 1935)

Bernard Jack Shapiro
- Born: June 8, 1935 (age 91); Montreal, Quebec
- Education: McGill University; Harvard University
- Occupations: Academic, Civil Servant
- Known for: Principal and Vice-Chancellor of McGill University & Ethics Commissioner of Canada
- Relatives: Harold Tafler Shapiro (Brother)
- Awards: Order of Canada; National Order of Quebec

Bernard Jack Shapiro, OC GOQ (born June 8, 1935) is a Canadian academic, civil servant, former Principal and Vice-Chancellor of McGill University from 1994 to 2004, and the first Ethics Commissioner of Canada between May 17, 2004 and March 29, 2007.

== Biography ==
Born in Montreal, Quebec, he received a Bachelor of Arts from McGill University in 1956. In 1967 he received a Doctorate in Education from Harvard University. He then joined the faculty of Boston University and later became Associate Dean of the School of Education. In 1976 he was appointed Dean of the Faculty of Education at the University of Western Ontario and became Vice-President (Academic) and Provost in 1978. From 1980 until 1986 he was the Director of the Ontario Institute for Studies in Education, and in 1984 published The Report of The Commission on Private Schools in Ontario for the Ministry of Education of Ontario.

In 1986 he joined the Ontario public service serving as Deputy Minister of Education, Deputy Minister of Skills Development, Deputy Secretary of Cabinet, Deputy Minister and Secretary of Management Board and Deputy Minister of Colleges and Universities. From 1992 until 1994 he was Professor of Education and Public Policy at the University of Toronto. From 1994 until 2004 he was Principal and Vice-Chancellor of McGill University. In May 2004 he was appointed the first Ethics Commissioner of Canada. His term was marked by controversy and then MP for Ottawa Centre, Ed Broadbent repeatedly called for his resignation.

He is the twin brother of Harold T. Shapiro, President Emeritus of Princeton University.

== Honours ==
- In 1999 he was made an Officer of the Order of Canada.
- In 2004 he was made a Grand Officer of the National Order of Quebec.
- He has received honorary degrees from McGill University, University of Toronto, University of Ottawa, Yeshiva University, McMaster University, Université de Montréal, University of Edinburgh, Bishop's University, Nipissing University, University of Melbourne and University of Glasgow.

Government offices
Preceded by None (new position)	Ethics Commissioner of Canada; 2004–2007	Succeeded by Position abolished- see Mary Dawson
