= Public Prosecution Service of Canada =

Government agency

- Service des poursuites pénales du Canada

Agency overview
- Formed: 2006
- Preceding agency: Federal Prosecution Service
- Jurisdiction: Canada
- Headquarters: 160 Elgin Street – 12th Floor, Ottawa, Ontario, K1A 0H8
- Employees: 1040; 170 private-sector law firms; 432 individually appointed lawyers
- Annual budget: $201,300,000 (2018–19)
- Minister responsible: Sean Fraser, Minister of Justice and Attorney General of Canada
- Agency executive: George Dolhai, Director of Public Prosecutions
- Key document: Director of Public Prosecutions Act
- Website: www.ppsc-sppc.gc.ca

The Public Prosecution Service of Canada (PPSC; French: Service des poursuites pénales du Canada (SPPC)) was established on December 12, 2006, by the Director of Public Prosecutions Act. A federal agency, the PPSC prosecutes offences on behalf of the Government of Canada. It is responsible to Parliament through the attorney general of Canada, who litigates on behalf of the Crown and has delegated most prosecution functions to the PPSC.

The director of public prosecutions – currently George Dolhai – leads the day-to-day operations of the PPSC and is responsible to the attorney general, and has the rank and status of a deputy head of a department. For the purposes of federal prosecutions, the director of public prosecutions is the deputy attorney general of Canada.

For federal cases in Canada, a senior general counsel (Criminal Law) is assigned from the PPSC, an office of the Attorney General of Canada. The headquarters of the service is located in Ottawa, Ontario.

== Responsibilities ==
The PPSC's primary role is to prosecute offences that belong to federal jurisdiction, such as those stemming from the Income Tax Act, Fisheries Act, Excise Act, Customs Act, Canada Elections Act, Canadian Environmental Protection Act and Competition Act.

It also handles offences related to the Controlled Drugs and Substances Act in the country, except in the provinces of Quebec and New Brunswick where only drug cases initiated by the Royal Canadian Mounted Police (RCMP) are brought before court by the PPSC. In Quebec, that would mean only narcotic cases with extraterritorial ramifications – which are handled by the RCMP – are prosecuted by the PPSC, as it has its own provincial police force, the Sûreté du Québec. New Brunswick does not have a provincial police force and relies on the RCMP.

In the three territories, the PPSC has jurisdiction over all Criminal Code offences. In the provinces, it is only in charge of a limited number of Criminal Code cases, which are usually related to terrorism, criminal organizations, money laundering, tax evasion and other crimes that violate federal laws. The vast majority of prosecutions are under the Controlled Drugs and Substances Act and the Criminal Code, with other major federal statutes that are enforced including the Fisheries Act, Income Tax Act, and Employment Insurance Act.

Beyond that, the PPSC can also give advice to any law enforcement agency nationwide and in various areas of federal legislation.

In limited cases explicitly delegated by provincial prosecution services due to conflicts of interest, the PPSC can pursue what would otherwise be a provincial prosecution, as it did in 2017 with respect to Ontario Premier Dalton McGuinty's chief of staff, David Livingston, in relation to hiring someone to illegally wipe government hard drives.

Until 2012, the PPSC was also responsible for collections of fines levied by courts through its successful prosecutions. The in-house collections team was scheduled to be eliminated in favour of an external collection agency. At the time of elimination, approximately $129 million (CAD) was outstanding in debt, across approximately 8,000 debtees. The PPSC retained the ability to garnish wages or pursue assets if fines were not paid. By 2018, outstanding debts had decreased to $8 million across 6,300 accounts, and a private company, Partners in Credit Inc., had been retained since 2016.

== History ==
The Public Prosecution Service of Canada was established in 2006 as an agency independent of the Department of Justice Canada, in order to remedy problems associated with the former Federal Prosecution Service being located within the Department. The Parliamentary Information and Research Service prepared a paper outlining the possible approaches that could be taken to creating the public prosecution service. The enacting legislation is the Director of Public Prosecutions Act, which was enacted as part of the Federal Accountability Act, but is now listed as a separate act. It was introduced by the president of the Treasury Board, John Baird, and received royal assent on December 12, 2006.

== SNC-Lavalin affair ==
The most prolific instance of the PPSC in the Canadian public eye was its role in the SNC-Lavalin affair, where the Prime Minister's Office asked in an allegedly improper fashion for the Attorney General of Canada Jody Wilson-Raybould to override a decision by Director of Public Prosecutions Kathleen Roussel to not extend a deferred prosecution agreement to SNC-Lavalin after its guilty plea in a fraud case in 2019. The Honourable Jody Wilson-Raybould did not agree to requests from senior Prime Minister's Office officials, or a later overture by Canada's most senior civil servant Michael Wernick. She purportedly objected to overriding the director without gazetting the findings. As a consequence of Hon. Jody Wilson-Raybould's actions, the PPSC was not overridden, despite the Attorney General's statutory authority to do so. The deferred prosecution agreement was a new addition to Canada's legal landscape and authority was bestowed upon the Director of Public Prosecutions. If SNC-Lavalin had received a deferred prosecution, it would not be subject to approximately 10-year sanctions from bidding on public infrastructure contracts in Canada. Instead, the bribery charge was eventually dropped after David Lametti became the new Attorney General, with SNC-Lavalin paying a $280 million dollar fraud charge, which would not have led to the prohibition on bidding.

== Other notable prosecutions ==
In 2018, the PPSC was referred an Ontario public prosecution dealing with a Hamilton West—Ancaster—Dundas candidate selection election by the Progressive Conservative Party of Ontario. A potential candidate not chosen sued the party and then leader Patrick Brown, and to avoid conflict of interest, the Attorney General of Ontario referred the case to the PPSC. Approximately a week later, the failed candidate withdrew his private suit, but the PPSC continued investigations.

The prosecution service recused itself from high-profile investigation of Mark Norman, given potential for conflict of interest, with the Alberta provincial prosecutor giving legal advice in the PPSC's stead.

The PPSC declined to prosecute in the case of alleged misconduct by the Ontario Liberal Party when a senior party official offered perquisites in return for a Sudbury Member of Provincial Parliament to step down to make way for federal New Democratic Member of Parliament Glenn Thibeault to run in that provincial electoral district.

== Criticism ==
In 2019, the PPSC saw criticism over activities in its Ontario office, where some prosecutors complained about being shamed or otherwise discouraged from getting pregnant and having children, as well as an alleged "white frat bro" culture. The PPSC responded with a commitment to improve the situation and culture.

Also in 2019, the PPSC conducted an internal investigation not released to the public about a botched prosecution related to a criminal defence lawyer not revealing evidence against police officers, resulting in perjury. The prosecution was eventually dropped, but the Criminal Lawyers Association had given official complaints to the Law Society of Ontario regarding the practices of three prosecutors that were allegedly complicit in misleading the court.

The PPSC received criticism in 2021 for failure to prosecute in a timely manner in the case of alleged military and corporate espionage of Qing Quentin Huang, a Canadian national accused of passing military secrets to the Chinese government from Irving Shipbuilding. After eight years of charges, a judge stayed the case under the principle of a right to a speedy trial. Blame was also allotted by the defense lawyers towards parliament, as a major factor in the delay of prosecution was national security disclosure, a matter that parliament had not resolved.

In the light of the legal backlog created by COVID-19, the PPSC issued recommended guidelines for determining which Canadian drug offences were to be prioritized to be tried, with a focus on diversion programs being used to create some rehabilitative and punitive result for accused persons. Critics such as MADD Canada were somewhat upset by this development due to an uptick in impaired driving being charged as careless driving.

== Directors of Public Prosecutions ==
List of directors of public prosecutions
Name	Start	End	Notes
Brian J. Saunders	December 12, 2006	June 27, 2017	acting, 2006–2008
Kathleen Roussel	June 27, 2017	June 21, 2024	
George Dolhai	June 21, 2024	Incumbent	
