= Democracy Watch (Canada) =

Canadian organization

Democracy Watch Canada
- Abbreviation: DW
- Formation: 1993
- Legal status: active
- Purpose: advocate and public voice, educator and network
- Headquarters: Ottawa, Ontario
- Region served: Canada
- Official language: English; French
- Leader: Duff Conacher (co-founder)
- Website: democracywatch.ca

Democracy Watch, established in 1993, is a Canadian organization that advocates on democratic reform, government accountability and corporate responsibility issues.

== Background ==
Duff Conacher co-founded Democracy Watch in September 1993. He served as coordinator until June 2011, and then again from April 2014 on. Conacher, who lives in Toronto, Ontario, is a graduate of the University of Toronto Faculty of Law.

Democracy Watch provides information and support, and works in conjunction with, good government and corporate responsibility organizations from other countries.

Democracy Watch has worked in collaboration with Global Integrity, which conducts assessments on the state of democracy and good government in various countries. (Note: While other organizations have been established in various countries since 1993 called Democracy Watch (for example, in Australia, Bangladesh, Liberia, Nepal, Pakistan, Somaliland, Thailand, Ukraine), these organizations are not affiliated with Democracy Watch in Canada. Democracy Watch in Canada focuses on democratic reform in Canada, while the other organizations focus on democratic reform in their countries.)

== In the media ==
A 2018 iPolitics article said that Democracy Watch, an "advocacy group for government accountability", recommended that Canada follow the lead of other countries with "parliamentary democracies", such as the U.K., Australia, and New Zealand, to develop "written rules for a minority government scenario" to replace the existing unwritten, traditional rules, which are "constitutional conventions".

Huffington Post cited Conacher and Democracy Watch in their report on an ethics investigation launched by Canada's conflict of interest and ethics commissioner, Mario Dion, related to Prime Minister Justin Trudeau's potential conflict of interest in the awarding of a $900M contract We Charity 2020 contract with the federal government.

In 2019, CBC News reported that Democracy Watch's Duff Conacher, had requested that the provincial ethics commissioner, Marguerite Trussler, in Alberta, investigate whether Alberta's Minister of Justice and Solicitor General, Doug Schweitzer, had violated Alberta's Conflicts of Interest Act when he appointed Steve Allan, as commissioner of the Public Inquiry into Anti-Alberta Energy Campaigns—a job with an annual salary of $290,000. In November 2019, CBC News had revealed emails showing Allan had supported and/or campaigned for Schweitzer in 2018 and 2019. In July 2020, Trussler ruled that Minister Schweitzer had not breached any conflict of interest, saying that, "Just because Mr. Allan made political donations to Minister Schweitzer in the past does not make the subsequent appointment of Mr. Allan as inquiry commissioner a private interest for the minister." In her ruling Trussler said, "It does stretch credibility that Mr. Allan did not consider whether or not there may possibly be a conflict of interest in his engaging of Dentons as counsel for the inquiry, given that, for all intents and purposes, the firm gave him free office space and both his close friend (although that alone is not significant) and his son were partners at the firm...[However], [n]either the minister, his children, nor his direct associates had any personal or particular interest in, or anything to gain from, the appointment of Mr. Allan as inquiry commissioner".

== See also ==
- List of democracy indices
