= Deferred prosecution agreement (Canada) =

Criminal Code, Part XXII.1

Parliament of Canada
- Citation: Criminal Code, RSC 1985, c. C-46, Part XXII.1, "Remediation Agreements"
- Enacted by: Parliament of Canada
- Royal assent: June 21, 2018
- Commenced: September 19, 2018

Legislative history
- Bill citation: C-74
- Introduced by: Hon. Bardish Chagger, Leader of the Government in the House of Commons
- First reading: March 27, 2018
- Second reading: April 23, 2018
- Third reading: June 6, 2018
- Member(s) in charge: The Hon. the Speaker of the Senate pro tempore
- First reading: June 7, 2018
- Second reading: June 11, 2018
- Third reading: June 14, 2018
- Status: In force

In Canada, a deferred prosecution agreement (DPA) or remediation agreement refers to an agreement under Part XXII.1 of the Criminal Code. The agreement is made between the Crown prosecutor and an organization alleged to have committed certain types of criminal offences, usually in the context of fraud or corruption, with the consent of the relevant Attorney General and under the supervision of a judge. Under a deferred prosecution agreement, the Crown prosecutor can agree to defer bringing a prosecution for the alleged offences if the organization takes steps to improve its conduct, makes restitution, and implements internal controls to avoid a repetition of the conduct.

In 2018, the government of Prime Minister Justin Trudeau introduced legislation to provide for deferred prosecution agreements in Canada, as part of the omnibus Budget Implementation Act, 2018, No. 1. The new provisions would be added to the Criminal Code as Part XXII.1. The government explained that the provisions would be an enhancement of the existing federal Integrity Regime. The goal of the legislation would be to give prosecutors additional tools to deal with allegations of commercial crimes. The Parliament of Canada enacted Part XXII.1 in June 2018.

The provisions have subsequently generated some political controversy. SNC-Lavalin, a major Canadian engineering firm, is facing criminal charges under the Criminal Code and the Corruption of Foreign Public Officials Act in relation to its business dealings in Libya and was one of the first corporations to seek a deferred prosecution agreement. The federal Public Prosecution Service of Canada refused that request, on the basis that SNC-Lavalin did not meet the conditions under Part XXII.1. Allegations were made that members of the Trudeau government had put inappropriate pressure on then-Minister of Justice, Jody Wilson-Raybould, to authorize a deferred prosecution agreement for SNC-Lavalin. Following an investigation by the Office of the Conflict of Interest and Ethics Commissioner (CIEC), the Commissioner released his report on and August 14, 2019 said that Prime Minister Trudeau had contravened the Conflict of Interest Act by seeking to directly and indirectly influence Wilson‑Raybould.

== Deferred prosecutions in other countries ==
"The United States (US) and United Kingdom (UK) have DPA regimes in place. In November 2016, France adopted a DPA-like mechanism to resolve anti-corruption investigations. The Australian Ministry of Justice released a public discussion paper on DPAs in 2016 and, in May 2017, completed consultations on a draft law."

— Expanding Canada's Toolkit to address Corporate Wrongdoing: Discussion paper. 2017

In the federal government's 2017 discussion paper, distributed as a guide for the public consultations that took place in the autumn of 2017 "regarding a possible DPA regime in Canada", a comparison was made between the DPAs in the United States since the 1990s and in the United Kingdom since 2014.

In DPAs in United Kingdom were authorized for use by the Crown Prosecution Service and the Serious Fraud Office for fraud, bribery and other economic crime. Unlike the American model, in Britain the courts have a role in approving proposed deferred prosecution agreements, adding to public transparency. In 2017 the UK broadened their use to include tax evasion cases.

However, the approach taken by American prosecutors has been criticized by US courts as being too lenient. In spite of these criticisms, the US courts have held that they have only a limited power to review deferred prosecution agreements. In most cases, the courts approve the agreements.

France enacted legislation authorizing deferred prosecution agreements in December 2016. The Minister of Justice of Australia introduced a federal DPA regime in 2017.

According to a February 27, 2019 Financial Post article by Terence Corcoran, internationally, most countries used deferred or negotiated settlements as opposed to turning to the courts when dealing with corporate corruption which has resulted in the payment of billions of dollars in fines. Corcoran said that government prosecutors have used deferred prosecution agreement to negotiate settlements with "Siemens, Walmart, Alcoa, Daimler, Alcatel-Lucent". In 2019 the United States had 130 active cases under negotiation under the U.S. Foreign Corrupt Practices Act (FCPA). Deferred prosecution agreements in the United States "... are governed by policy and practice rather than binding regulations." Major cases in included Munich-based Siemens, one of the largest companies in the world, that had to pay a total fine of $1.6 bill in mid-December 2008—the "largest fine for bribery in modern corporate history." According to a 2008 NPR article, an FBI investigator said that Seimens' "actions were not an anomaly"...executives in corporations used bribery as a standard operating procedure and a "business strategy" to win contracts.

In July 2017, Transparency International Canada, the Canadian branch of a global anti-corruption non-government coalition, released a detailed report on deferred prosecutions. The report reviewed deferred prosecution legislation in several other countries and discussed the arguments for and against deferred prosecutions. The report concluded that: "On balance, as a means of pursuing greater enforcement of and compliance with anti-corruption laws, we urge the Government of Canada to consider adopting a properly designed DPA mechanism".

== Development of Canadian legislation ==
=== Initial steps ===
In 2015, the Public Services and Procurement Canada (PSPC) department of the government of Canada introduced the Integrity Regime, to "ensure the government does business only with ethical suppliers in Canada and abroad". Under the Integrity Regime, PSPC reviews cases of alleged corrupt business practices, to determine "whether a supplier is ineligible to do business with the government", usually in relation to "procurement and real property transactions over $10,000".

Discussions about the potential establishment of deferred prosecution agreement legislation in Canada began in February 2016. Under traditional criminal law, Canadian prosecutors only had two options: "prosecute and charge alleged offenders, or decide not to prosecute alleged offenders".

=== Public consultation process ===
In September 2017, PSPC announced a public consultation on potential enhancements to the Integrity Regime, and "whether deferred prosecution agreements should be used in Canada". PSPC published a discussion paper, and also provided a web page to guide discussion. The consultation was regarding "potential enhancements to the recently implemented Integrity Regime" which could include the implementation of deferred prosecution agreements in Canada, similar to the one adopted in the United Kingdom to respond to corporate wrongdoing.

PSPC described the potential deferred prosecution legislation as a means of ensuring "corporate criminal conduct is subject to effective, proportionate and dissuasive penalties" while mitigating "unintended consequences associated with a criminal conviction for blameless employees, customers, pensioners, suppliers and investors". PSPC also recognized that in some cases, a criminal conviction could lead to "job losses and wider negative implications to the economy." During the public consultation period, the government received 75 written submissions. PSPC also conducted meetings with approximately 350 interested parties and groups, such as industry associations, businesses, justice sector stakeholders (including law enforcement), non-governmental organizations, and academics.

=== Results of the consultation ===
"The majority of participants stated that additional discretion and flexibility needed to be built into the Integrity Regime to take into account aggravating and mitigating factors in the determination of an appropriate period of debarment. Factors that were identified included the seriousness of the offence, whether the individual or company was a repeat offender, self-reporting, cooperation with law enforcement, taking corrective actions, and efforts at restitution."

— "Expanding Canada’s toolkit to address corporate wrongdoing: What we heard." February 22, 2018

The report on the public consultation process was released on February 22, 2018. The report stated that a majority of participants supported having a Canadian regime for deferred prosecution agreements. The majority also favoured an approach based on the United Kingdom regime, which was seen as having greater transparency than the American model.

The report noted that the "vast majority" of the participants in the consultation believed that deferred prosecution agreements were "best suited for economic offences committed by organizations, such as fraud, offences under the Corruption of Foreign Public Officials Act, bribery, money laundering and, generally, offences under the Competition Act". Participants stated that deferred prosecution agreements would give the prosecutor more options in dealing with commercial crime, rather than the current binary choice of prosecuting or not prosecuting. However, participants also suggested that the factors which prosecutors should consider in deciding whether to offer an agreement should be specifically set out in the legislation.

Participants considered that publication of the general terms of a deferred prosecution agreement would be important for purposes of public transparency. Most participants favoured the British model, with a strong supervisory role by the courts to ensure that a proposed agreement is in the public interest and that the terms of a particular agreement are "fair, reasonable, and proportionate".

On March 27, 2018, PSPC issued a media release to announce an enhancement of the "government-wide Integrity Regime", which it described as a "made-in-Canada version of a deferred prosecution agreement (DPA) regime, to be known as a Remediation Agreement Regime". It also announced that amendments to the Criminal Code would be introduced to implement the new legal procedure.

== Enactment of legislation ==
On March 27, 2018, the Government introduced legislation to create a system for deferred prosecution agreements. Although the legislation amended the Criminal Code, it was not framed as a stand-alone amendment to the Code. Instead, it was included in the omnibus budget legislation. The amendments to the Criminal Code were found in Division 20 of Part Six of the budget bill. The amendments would add a new Part XXII.1 to the Criminal Code to authorize deferred prosecution agreements, termed "remediation agreements".

The inclusion of the amendments to the Criminal Code in a budget bill attracted some criticism from members of the all-party Finance Committee of the House of Commons, in their review of the budget bill. Some members of the committee commented that they only became aware of the Criminal Code amendments during the testimony of an official from the Department of Justice, and even one Liberal MP on the committee, Greg Fergus, stated that he was caught by surprise by the provision. Pierre-Luc Dusseault, a New Democrat, said that he thought the provision was tucked into the budget bill to make the change quietly, without much opportunity to debate it.

Some members of the Finance Committee suggested the proposal should be referred to the Justice Committee of the Commons, which has greater expertise in criminal law, while others suggested that the proposed amendments should be taken out of the budget bill and made into a separate bill. One Conservative MP, Dan Albas, supported these options, stating that: "This is a fundamental departure from the way we handle the Criminal Code". The Liberal majority on the committee declined to do so. Greg Fergus, a Liberal MP, also stated he had concerns with the substance of the proposed legislation, which would allow those charged with white-collar crimes to avoid serious criminal sanctions: "It seems we're letting those with the means have an easier time of it than those who don't have the means."

The bill passed the House of Commons on June 6, 2018 and the Senate on June 14, 2018. It received royal assent on June 21, 2018. The provisions for deferred prosecution agreements came into force ninety days after royal assent, namely September 19, 2018.

== Outline of the legislation ==
The federal Department of Justice issued a "Backgrounder" on the new legislation in March 2018. According to that summary, the main purposes of a remediation agreement are:

- To denounce an organization’s wrongdoing and the harms that such wrongdoing has caused to victims or to the community;
- To hold the organization accountable for the wrongdoing;
- To require the organization to put measures in place to correct the problem and prevent similar problems in the future;
- To reduce the harm that a criminal conviction of an organization could have for employees, shareholders and other third parties who did not take part in the offence; and
- To help repair harm done to victims or to the community, including through reparations and restitution.

The Backgrounder also emphasized that only certain types of organizations could qualify for a deferred prosecution agreement. Government agencies, trade unions and municipalities would not be eligible. Nor would crimes committed by, or at the direction of, criminal or terrorist organizations. As well, only certain types of economic crimes could be considered for deferred prosecution, such as fraud or bribery. Crimes which resulted in death or serious bodily harm, or that damaged national defence or national security, would not be eligible. The offences which would be eligible for consideration for a deferred prosecution agreement are specifically listed in a schedule to the Criminal Code.

Part XXII.1 also sets out conditions which must be met before a Crown prosecutor may enter into negotiations with an accused organization. One of those conditions is that the relevant Attorney General must consent to the negotiation of the agreement. Another condition is that a deferred prosecution agreement must be in the public interest. Part XXII.1 then sets out a lengthy list of factors which the Crown prosecutor must consider, such as the "nature and gravity" of the alleged offence, whether the organization has taken internal steps to prevent further misconduct, and whether it has cooperated with the authorities and made reparations for the harm it has caused.

Part XXII.1 also sets out factors which the Crown prosecutor is not permitted to take into account in considering whether to open negotiations. In the case of charges under the Corruption of Foreign Public Officials Act, the prosecutor "must not consider the national economic interest, the potential effect on relations with a state other than Canada or the identity of the organization or individual involved."

== Reactions to the new provisions ==
According to the Law Times, the provisions for deferred prosecution agreements change the way Canadian prosecutors can prosecute white-collar crime, by including a remediation system whereby offenders can avoid conviction if "they co-operate with the Crown and the courts". The Law Times cited Ottawa-based counsel Patrick McCann, who said that the deferred prosecution provisions would "bring Canada in line with many other countries that have deferred prosecution agreements, including the U.S., the U.K. and most other European countries". According to McCann, a deferred prosecution agreement "addresses the unfairness of the situation when you have a large company that has a rogue senior officer" who has committed a crime with the entire company getting blamed. McCann said that deferred prosecution agreements are fair to investors in companies who are innocent of any wrongdoing.

Through the regime, companies have added incentives to comply and to "self-report potential wrongdoing". According to John Boscariol, except for a few cases in the early 2010s, Canada has been slow to enforce its anti-bribery law, partially because it lacked the tools, such as a deferred-prosecution agreement regime. Several major law firms confirmed that the legislation gave incentives for corporations to be pro-active in detecting illegal conduct, self-reporting, and creating internal structures to prevent illegal acts. The new provisions also give more tools to prosecutors, instead of the options to prosecute or not prosecute.

According to Dalhousie University's Graham Steele — a Rhodes Scholar, lawyer and former provincial finance minister in Nova Scotia — "investigating and prosecuting ... transnational corruption cases can be incredibly difficult, time consuming and expensive". Criminal court cases take years to complete and it is very difficult for prosecutors to prove beyond a reasonable doubt that the defendant is guilty. Steele explained that in Canada, while the "attorney general has to sign off on a DPA", the Attorney General does not initiate or request that a prosecutor initiate an agreement.

One trans-national law firm, Dentons, commented that while most of the Canadian provisions are similar to those in other countries, such as Britain, there is one aspect of the Canadian legislation which is unique to Canada: the requirement that victims of the conduct be informed of the proceedings and their right to compensation. The definition of "victim" is very broad. Coupled with the right to compensation, this aspect of the Canadian regime will likely result in large numbers applying for compensation, if a deferred prosecution agreement is being proposed to the courts.

== SNC-Lavalin ==
"I found that Mr. Trudeau used his position of authority over Ms. Wilson‑Raybould to seek to influence, both directly and indirectly, her decision on whether she should overrule the Director of Public Prosecutions' decision not to invite SNC-Lavalin to enter into negotiations towards a remediation agreement. Therefore, I find that Mr. Trudeau contravened section 9 of the [Conflict of Interest Act (Act) S.C. 2006, c.9, s.2.]."

— Mario Dion. CIEC. "Trudeau II Report". August 14, 2019.

Quebec construction company SNC-Lavalin was one of the first major companies in Canada to seek a deferred prosecution agreement. The Economist reported on allegations in February 2019 that Trudeau and his officials had attempted to influence justice minister and attorney general, Jody Wilson-Raybould, to use the DPA instead of prosecuting SNC-Lavalin on bribery charges. Following an investigation into alleged violations of the Conflict of Interest Act, the August 14, 2019 57-page report by the Office of the Conflict of Interest and Ethics Commissioner (CIEC) found that Prime Minister Trudeau had contravened the Conflict of Interest Act. The report detailed the process through which the DPA was established in Canada.

Immediately after the CIEC report was released, Anne McLellan, released her report that had been commissioned by Trudeau at "the height of the SNC-Lavalin controversy". Trudeau had ordered the McLellan report to investigate whether there was a conflict in having one person as both justice minister and attorney general, as was the case for Wilson-Raybould. According to an iPolitico article, legal experts said that the dual role complicates the Shawcross doctrine—through which the "attorney general is supposed to act independently on any prosecutorial decisions". Trudeau said at an August 14 press conference that the McLellan report recommendations, that did not include separating the two offices, "would help the government address the issues identified in the SNC-Lavalin controversy and protect prosecutorial independence." According to a CBC News interview, Trudeau responded to the CIEC report by accepting "responsibility". Even if Trudeau believed that Wilson-Raybould "did fail here somehow", [he] and his advisers would still be responsible for respecting the Shawcross doctrine, which protects the independence of the attorney general from political pressure." He added that he "can't apologize for standing up for Canadian jobs."
