= Office of the Conflict of Interest and Ethics Commissioner =

Canadian government ethics agency

Conflict of Interest and Ethics Commissioner of Canada
- Commissaire aux conflits d'intérêts et à l'éthique
- Incumbent; Konrad von Finckenstein since 30 August 2023
- Abbreviation: CIEC
- Reports to: Parliament of Canada
- Nominator: Prime Minister of Canada
- Appointer: Governor in council
- Term length: 7 years renewable once
- First holder: Mary Dawson
- Salary: $314,100 (Equal to a Judge of the Federal Court of Canada)
- Website: ciec-ccie.parl.gc.ca

Office of the Conflict of Interest and Ethics Commissioner
- Commissariat aux conflits d'intérêts et à l'ethique

Agency overview
- Formed: 2006
- Headquarters: Ottawa, Ontario, Canada
- Annual budget: $6.5 million (2019)

The Conflict of Interest and Ethics Commissioner of Canada is an entity of the Parliament of Canada. The commissioner is an independent officer of Parliament, who administers the Conflict of Interest Act and the Conflict of Interest Code for Members of the House of Commons and is supported in this role by the Office of the Conflict of Interest and Ethics Commissioner. The position came into effect on July 9, 2007, with the coming into force of the Conflict of Interest Act. This act, in turn, was enacted as part of the Federal Accountability Act.

The current commissioner is Konrad von Finckenstein having served since August 30, 2023. The previous commissioner was Martine Richard having served for several weeks in the spring 2023, before resigning. Mary Dawson (2007-2018) and Mario Dion (2018-2023) both previously held the role.

== Overview of the Office ==
The Office of the Conflict of Interest and Ethics Commissioner is an entity of the Parliament of Canada, along with the House of Commons of Canada, the Senate of Canada and the Library of Parliament.

Unlike other officers or agents of Parliament, whose offices are created by the legislation they administer, the conflict of interest and ethics commissioner is an officer of Parliament whose mandate is set out in the Parliament of Canada Act.

The commissioner produces two annual reports: one on the office's activities under the Conflict of Interest Act and one on activities under the Conflict of Interest Code for Members of the House of Commons. These two regimes seek to prevent conflicts between the public duties and private interests of elected and appointed officials.

The Office of the Conflict of Interest and Ethics Commissioner provides its budget estimates to the speaker of the House of Commons; they are reviewed by the Standing Committee on Access to Information, Privacy and Ethics, which has oversight of the Conflict of Interest Act. Information about the office's resources are provided in its annual reports and annual financial statements, which are available on the office's website.

The Conflict of Interest Act for public office holders (ministers, ministers of state, Parliamentary secretaries, ministerial staff and governor-in-council appointees) and the Conflict of Interest Code for Members of the House of Commons set out a number of obligations and prohibit various activities that involve conflicts between private and public interests, or have the potential to do so.

The office administers these two regimes through a variety of activities. These include providing confidential advice to public office holders and elected members of Parliament about how to comply with the act and the members' code. The office also reviews these individuals' confidential disclosures of their assets, liabilities and activities, and is tasked with making publicly declarable information available through a public registry, investigating possible contraventions of the act or members' code, and reporting to Parliament.

The commissioner is also mandated to provide confidential advice to the prime minister about conflict of interest and ethics issues.

== Independence of the commissioner ==
The commissioner's status as an officer of Parliament ensures independence from the government of the day.

The commissioner is solely responsible to Parliament and not to the federal government or an individual minister. The office belongs to Parliament itself. The commissioner enjoys the privileges and immunities of the House of Commons and its members when carrying out official duties and functions.

The commissioner's independence is further assured in several ways:

- The commissioner is appointed under the Parliament of Canada Act by the governor in council after consultation with the leader of every recognized party in the House of Commons. The commissioner is appointed for a renewable seven-year term and may only be removed for cause by the governor in council on address of the House of Commons.
- The commissioner is a separate employer, with the office having its own terms and conditions of employment. Employees are not part of the federal public administration.
- The commissioner reports directly to Parliament rather than through a minister. The commissioner submits an annual report in respect of the Conflict of Interest Code for Members of the House of Commons to the speaker of the House of Commons for tabling in the house, and an annual report in respect of the Conflict of Interest Act to the speaker of the House of Commons and the speaker of the Senate for tabling in their respective chambers.
- Responsibility for reviewing the Commissioner's Annual Report in respect of the Conflict of Interest Act falls to the Standing Committee on Access to Information, Privacy and Ethics. Responsibility for reviewing the Commissioner's Annual Report in respect of the Conflict of Interest Code for Members of the House of Commons falls to the Standing Committee on Procedure and House Affairs.
- The commissioner submits the office's annual spending estimates to the speaker of the House of Commons. The speaker then transmits them to the president of the Treasury Board, who lays them before the House of Commons with the government's estimates for the fiscal year. Annual budget estimates are reviewed by the Standing Committee on Access to Information, Privacy and Ethics.

The office is a member of the following organizations:

- The Canadian Conflict of Interest Network (CCOIN), which consists of Canadian federal, provincial and territorial conflict of interest and ethics commissioners; and
- The Council on Government Ethics Laws (COGEL), a U.S.-based international not-for-profit organization of government ethics practitioners.

== History ==
The Office of the Conflict of Interest and Ethics Commissioner was created under the Federal Accountability Act. This legislation received royal assent on December 12, 2006. The part that relates to the Office, the Conflict of Interest Act, came into effect on July 9, 2007.

The office, however, has several direct ancestors that predate this legislation, and its origins can be traced back to the 1970s.

The first conflict of interest guidelines for cabinet ministers were issued in 1973 by the prime minister. They included prohibitions on the use of insider information for private gain, restrictions on outside activities and a requirement that ministers either divest or publicly declare certain assets. Some of the guidelines, such as a prohibition on corporate directorships, reflected informal policies that had been in place for a number of years. Others, such as the requirement to publicly declare certain assets, were borrowed from other jurisdictions.

Guidelines for various groups of public servants and governor-in-council appointees were also introduced in 1973. They were similar to those for ministers; more specific requirements for senior Crown corporation and agency officials were set by the minister responsible. Plans to appoint Canada's first federal conflict of interest administrator were also announced.

In 1974, an assistant deputy registrar general was named and an office was established within the former Department of Consumer and Corporate Affairs. In addition to maintaining a registry of public declarations, the office provided conflict of interest advice to ministers and other public officials.

Throughout the 1970s and 1980s, the conflict of interest guidelines administered by the Office of the Assistant Deputy Registrar General were modified several times. Most notably, in 1985, the Conflict of Interest and Post-Employment Code for Public Office Holders was issued, consolidating in one document the rules for ministers, parliamentary secretaries, ministerial staff, all public servants and Governor-in-Council appointees.

Nine years later, in 1994, a revised Conflict of Interest and Post-Employment Code for Public Office Holders was issued. The assistant deputy registrar general was replaced by an ethics counsellor, who served under the general direction of the clerk of the Privy Council. Howard Wilson was appointed as ethics counsellor, and administrative support for the Office of the Ethics Counsellor was provided by Industry Canada. The 1994 code was amended in 2003, 2004 and 2006.

In April 2004, the office was made independent of government. An amendment to the Parliament of Canada Act came into force, creating a new office and the new position of ethics commissioner. While its predecessors were part of the government, the Office of the Ethics Commissioner was made a separate parliamentary entity in order to help ensure its independence. The first commissioner was appointed, namely Bernard Shapiro. Shapiro had responsibility for administering the Conflict of Interest and Post-Employment Code for Public Office Holders, and also assumed responsibility for the new Conflict of Interest and Ethics Code for Members of the House of Commons (members' code), which came into effect in October 2004. The members' code built on various conflict of interest rules that were included in the Parliament of Canada Act and the former Senate and House of Commons Act. The members' code is still in place, although it has been amended several times since 2004.

In May 2005, Shapiro partially cleared Judy Sgro of wrongdoing regarding the Strippergate scandal and associated conflict of interest allegations.

On March 3, 2006, Shapiro announced that he was launching a preliminary inquiry into conflict-of-interest allegations against David Emerson and Stephen Harper. Shapiro said that he would look into what influence may have been wielded in the decision by Emerson to cross the floor. Conservatives criticized Shapiro's probe as partisan and accused him of applying a double standard since he was appointed on the advice of the former Liberal prime minister, and had turned down earlier requests in 2005 to investigate Stronach's floor-crossing in which she received a Cabinet post, as well as a questionable land sale by Hamilton area Liberal MP Tony Valeri. Shapiro was also criticized by former NDP leader Ed Broadbent for "extraordinarily serious credibility problems". While agreeing with Harper that Shapiro's investigation was inappropriate, Broadbent and opposition MPs criticized Harper for refusing to cooperate with the commissioner.

The Conflict of Interest Act, which replaced the Conflict of Interest and Post-Employment Code for Public Office Holders came into force on July 9, 2007. The Conflict of Interest Act was enacted as part of the 2006 Federal Accountability Act, creating for the first time a legislative framework for conflict of interest for public office holders. This omnibus legislation received royal assent on December 12, 2006.

The Federal Accountability Act tightened political party financing, amended the political appointments process, and created a legislative regime governing certain aspects of the ethical conduct of public office holders, both during and after employment. It also established the Office of the Conflict of Interest and Ethics Commissioner, and created the new position of conflict of interest and ethics commissioner, replacing the previous position of ethics commissioner. The commissioner is responsible for administering both the Conflict of Interest Act and the members' code.

Mary Dawson was the first commissioner, appointed on July 9, 2007, with the coming into force of the Conflict of Interest Act. Her initial appointment was for a term of seven years. She was reappointed in July 2014 for a two-year term. In July 2016, she was reappointed on an interim basis until January 8, 2018.

In 2017, Dawson completed an investigation into a December 2016 vacation that Justin Trudeau and his family took to a private island owned by the Aga Khan. Dawson found that Trudeau had broken ethics rules by accepting transportation and accommodation on the island.

Mario Dion was named conflict of interest and ethics commissioner on January 9, 2018.

In March 2019, Dion began an investigation concerning the SNC-Lavalin affair. On 14 August 2019, he released a report that concluded Trudeau had contravened section 9 of the Conflict of Interest Act by improperly pressuring Jody Wilson-Raybould.

On July 3, 2020, the commissioner announced an investigation into Justin Trudeau and the government's decision to have WE Charity administer the summer student grant program.

In February 2023, Mario Dion announced his resignation for health reasons. At the time of his resignation, he had two years left in his seven year term.

On March 27, 2023, Martine Richard was appointed ethics commissioner to replace Mario Dion who resigned a month earlier. In the days after Richard's appointment, opposition parties criticized her appointment to the role, due to her perceived closeness to the government. She is Dominic LeBlanc's sister-in-law. After serving a few weeks in the position, she resigned as commissioner and returned to her previous role as a lawyer in the commissioner's office. While the ethics commissioner position is vacant, the office is unable to undertake any investigations.
