= Department of Justice (Canada) =

Government department

- Ministère de la Justice

Department overview
- Formed: 1867
- Type: Department responsible for oversight of the Canadian justice system
- Jurisdiction: Canada
- Employees: Over 5,000
- Minister responsible: Sean Fraser, Minister of Justice and Attorney General of Canada
- Deputy Minister responsible: Marie-Josée Hogue
- Child Department: Public Prosecution Service of Canada
- Website: canada.justice.gc.ca

The Department of Justice (French: Ministère de la Justice) is a department of the Government of Canada that represents the Canadian government in legal matters. The Department of Justice works to ensure that Canada's justice system is as fair, accessible and efficient as possible. The department helps the federal government to develop policy and to draft and reform laws as needed. At the same time, it acts as the government's legal adviser, providing legal counsel and support, and representing the Government of Canada in court.

The department's responsibilities reflect the double role of the Minister of Justice, who is also by law the Attorney General of Canada: in general terms, the Minister is concerned with the administration of justice, including policy in such areas as criminal law, family law, human rights law, and Aboriginal justice; the Attorney General is the chief law officer of the Crown, responsible for conducting all litigation for the federal government.

While the role of the Minister of Justice has existed since 1867, the department was not created until 1868. The headquarters of the Department of Justice is located in Ottawa at St. Andrew's Tower (284 Wellington St, Ottawa, ON K1A 0H8), a modern low rise office tower built in 1987.

The 54th and current Minister of Justice and Attorney General of Canada is Sean Fraser.

== History ==
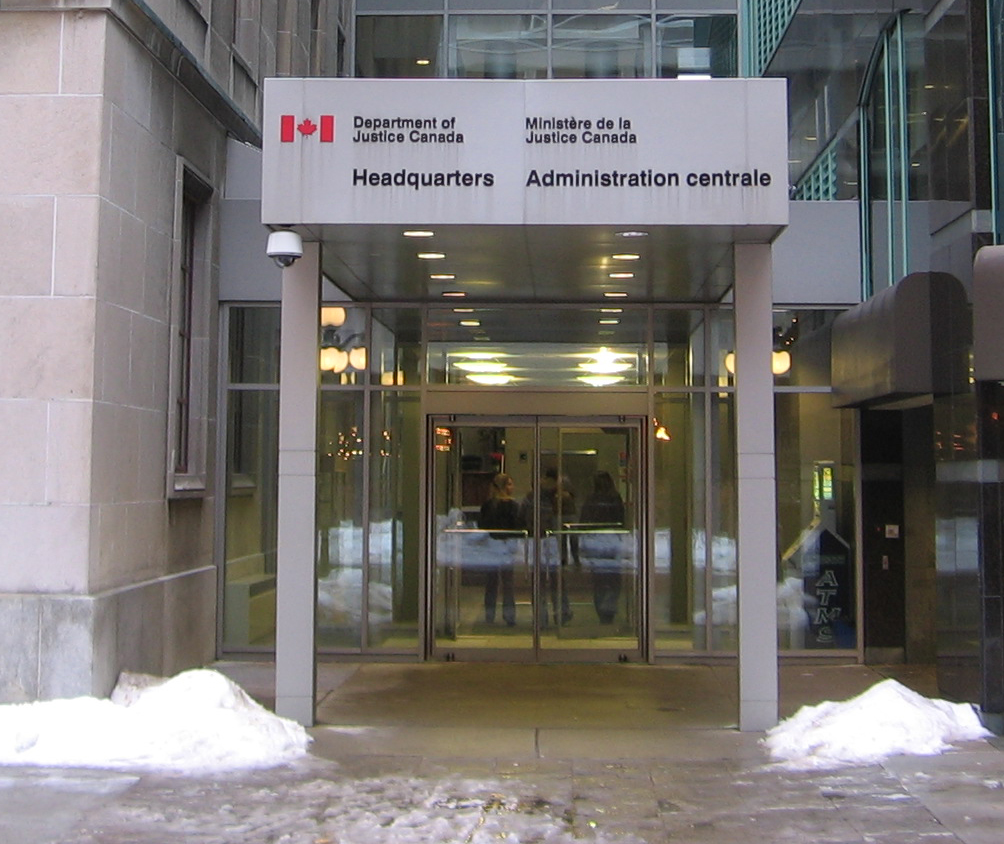
Sparks Street headquarters in Ottawa

At the time of Confederation in 1867, the Province of Canada had two Crown Law Departments, one for Canada West (now Ontario) and one for Canada East (now Quebec). At Confederation, the Crown Law Department, Canada West began to act as the new Department of Justice, reporting to John A. Macdonald, who was Minister of Justice, Attorney General, and the new prime minister. The Crown Law Department, Canada East became the new Department of the Militia, following its former Attorney General, George-Étienne Cartier.

The Department of Justice came into being in May 1868, when the Department of Justice Act was passed by Parliament. The Act formally recognized the informal structure that was already in place. The Act also laid out the distinct roles of the Minister of Justice and the Attorney General: the Minister was a partisan political adviser to the Crown, while the Attorney General provided legal services.

The new Department of Justice had only seven staff: two barristers-at-law (including the Deputy Minister, Hewitt Bernard), a clerk and shorthand writer (Macdonald's personal secretary), a copy clerk, a clerk articling under Macdonald, and two messengers.

The legal branch of the department remained relatively small for many years. As late as 1939, the department employed only seven lawyers. The department's first woman lawyer, Henrietta Bourque, was hired in 1939, but the department remained heavily male-dominated. In the 25 years between 1939 and 1964, only five female lawyers were hired by the department.

Although the Department of Justice Act had given the department responsibility for all litigation for or against the government, many government departments hired their own lawyers to provide them with legal advice. In 1962, however, these departmental lawyers were brought together in a common legal service. Although many lawyers still work closely with other government departments in departmental legal services units, they are now considered to be employees of the Department of Justice.

Regional offices were opened in Montreal (1965), Toronto (1966), Vancouver (1967), Winnipeg (1969), Halifax, Edmonton, Saskatoon, the Northwest Territories, and Iqaluit (Nunavut). The Department of Justice co-chaired the Interdepartmental Working Group on Trafficking in Persons with the Department of Foreign Affairs, Trade and Development from 1999 until 2012.

The department employs 5,000 people, nearly half of whom are lawyers, in offices across the country mostly under the Public Prosecution Service of Canada.

== Structure ==
- Minister of Justice and Attorney General
  - Deputy Minister (list)
    - Associate Deputy Ministers
      - Chief General Counsel
      - Director General, Corporate Secretariat
      - Director, Audit and Management Studies
      - Executive Director, Office of Strategic Planning and Performance Management
      - Director, Public Prosecutions Service of Canada
    - Assistant Deputy Minister, Business and Regulatory Law Portfolio
    - Assistant Deputy Attorney General, Aboriginal Affairs
    - Assistant Deputy Attorney General, Litigation
    - Assistant Deputy Attorney General, Tax Law
    - Assistant Deputy Attorney General, Citizenship, Immigration and Public Safety Portfolio
    - Assistant Deputy Minister, Central Agencies Portfolio
    - Assistant Deputy Minister, Public Law and Legislative Services
    - Senior Assistant Deputy Minister, Policy Group
    - Assistant Deputy Minister, Corporate Services
    - Senior Regional Director, Atlantic Regional Office
    - Senior Regional Director, Ontario Regional Office
    - Senior Regional Director, Quebec Regional Office
    - Senior Regional Director, B.C. Regional Office
    - Senior Regional Director, Prairies Regional Office
    - Senior Regional Director, Northern Region
    - Director General, Communications

== See also ==
- Supreme Court of Canada
- Criminal Code
- Young Offenders Act
