= 2022 British Columbia New Democratic Party leadership election =

- October 21, 2022
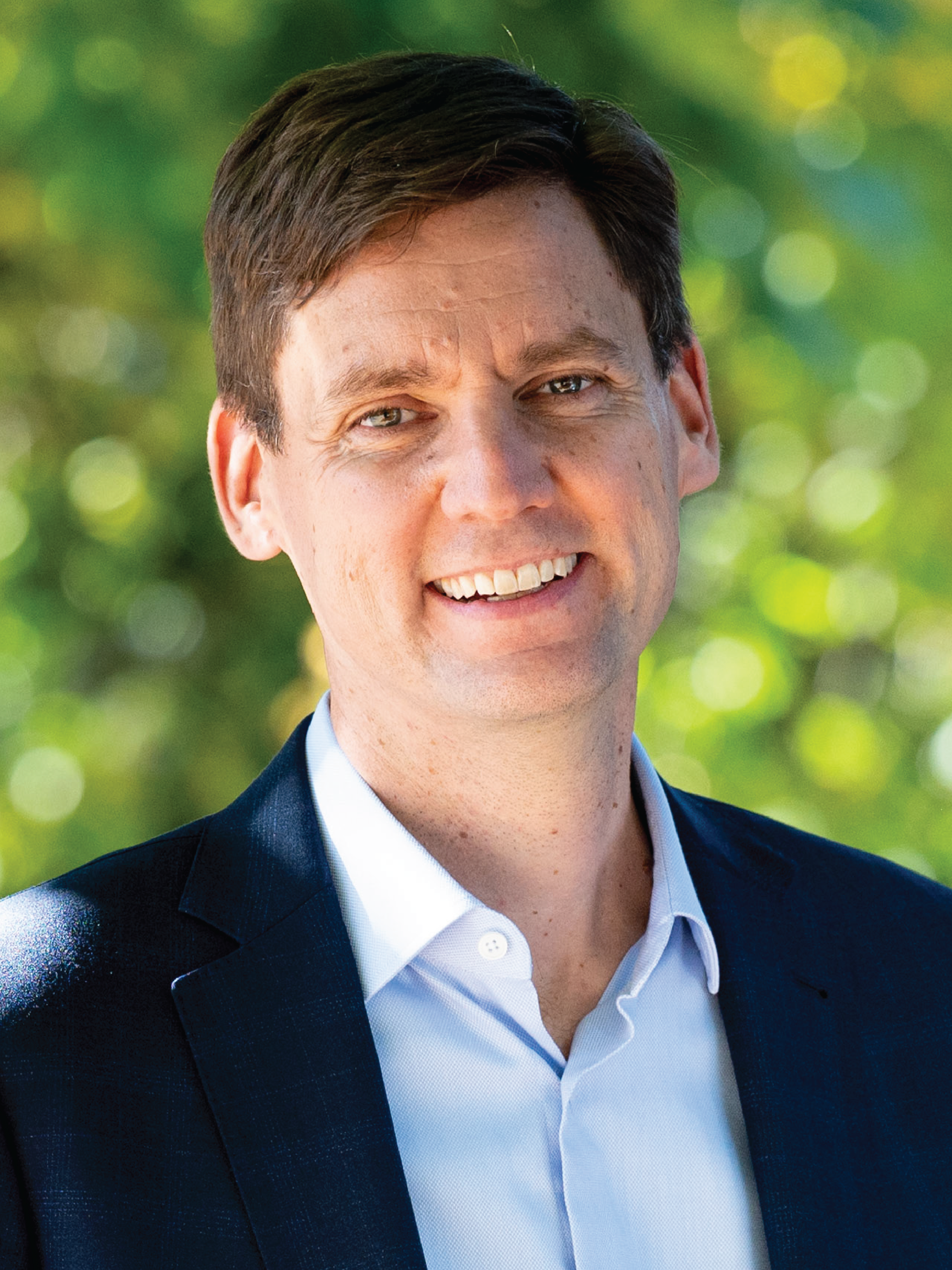
Candidate	David Eby
First ballot	Acclaimed
Leader before election
John Horgan
Elected Leader
David Eby

2022 British Columbia New Democratic Party leadership election
- Date: October 21, 2022
- Resigning leader: John Horgan
- Won by: David Eby
- Ballots: 0 (acclamation)
- Candidates: 1
- Entrance fee: $15,000

In 2022, the British Columbia New Democratic Party (NDP) held a leadership election to select a new leader. The contest was prompted by John Horgan's announcement in June 2022 that he would step down as leader of the party once a new leader had been chosen. As the NDP has formed the government of the province since 2017, newly elected leader David Eby was subsequently sworn in as premier of British Columbia.

The convention was scheduled to take place in the fourth quarter of 2022. Two candidates were in the contest: David Eby and Anjali Appadurai. On October 20, 2022, Appadurai was disqualified after campaign violations. As Eby was the sole remaining candidate in the contest, he was acclaimed leader on October 21.

== Rules and procedures ==
On July 16, 2022, the NDP formally announced the leadership contest after the party's governing bodies ratified the rules. To run for leader, a candidate must submit their application to the party alongside a $15,000 entrance fee by October 4, 2022. To vote in the contest, one had to join the party before September 4, 2022. BC NDP membership was open to all British Columbia residents whose were Canadian citizens or permanent residents and who were at least 12 years old. The voting period was scheduled to begin on November 13, 2022, and last until December 2, 2022, with the results being announced on December 3.

== Timeline ==
=== 2022 ===
- June 28 – John Horgan announces his intention to resign as premier of British Columbia and leader of the NDP
- July 17 — Campaign period officially begins
- September 4 — Deadline to sign up as a member for purposes of voting in the leadership race
- October 4 — Deadline for potential candidates to enter the contest
- October 19 — Deadline for candidates to meet all entry requirements
- October 20 — Anjali Appadurai is disqualified, leaving David Eby as the sole candidate in the race.
- October 21 — David Eby is acclaimed leader.

== Campaign ==
=== Speculation and announcements ===
John Horgan had been leader since the party's 2014 leadership election and led the party through two provincial elections. Under his leadership, the NDP formed a minority government with the support of the Green Party at the 2017 election, the first time they had formed government since the 1996 election. He subsequently won a majority government in the 2020 election. On June 28, 2022, Horgan announced that he would be stepping down as premier, citing concerns regarding his health; he had recently recovered from cancer. Horgan had recently faced criticism for pushing forward a plan to redevelop the Royal BC Museum for $789 million, which had been reversed.

Following Horgan's announcement, political commentators suggested that several cabinet ministers might be considering running for the leadership: David Eby, Ravi Kahlon, Selina Robinson, Katrina Chen, Nathan Cullen, Adrian Dix, Rob Fleming, Bowinn Ma, Josie Osborne and Jennifer Whiteside. On July 6, Kahlon ruled himself out as a candidate and endorsed Eby. Kahlon's endorsement came as a surprise, as he and Eby had been seen as likely frontrunners; pundits suggested that the race was essentially over before it even started. On July 13, it was reported that Robinson was considering a run, but on July 18, she announced that she would not run. Chen, Dix, Fleming, Ma, Osborne and Whiteside all endorsed Eby, while Cullen also ruled himself out. Eby formally announced his candidacy on July 19.

Anjali Appadurai, a former candidate for the federal riding of Vancouver Granville, announced her candidacy on August 10.

=== Campaign period ===
Eby, previously the attorney general and housing minister, was widely seen as the frontrunner in the race. Eby had turned down invitations to run for party leadership in 2014, instead serving as campaign manager for John Horgan's run. 48 of the 57 members of the party caucus supported his candidacy. Eby was seen as a moderate, and as a "status-quo" candidate, with his campaign focused on claims of providing availability for middle-class housing, and a focus on remedying the homelessness crisis in larger cities such as Vancouver. Eby proposed a tax on house flipping, a law on preventing stratas from excluding young families, and earmarking $500,000 in grants for non-profit organizations to purchase rental buildings and preventing housing displacement. On a campaign stop in the Sunshine Coast, Eby claimed he would "dramatically [increase] the availability of both housing and healthcare workers" to address both affordability and healthcare concerns.

Appadurai announced her candidacy after she and others expressed concerns that the race would be a "no-questions-asked coronation", stating that it was "not good for democracy". Appadurai was best known for her speech at the 2011 United Nations Climate Change Conference during her time as a college student, which went viral. Appadurai ran as a democratic socialist, reframing how the provincial executive approaches decision making away from industry, along with proposing a transition that put workers first. Appadurai expressed her critique of the incumbent NDP government's failures on the issues of "climate, affordability, and on stopping ... wealth accumulation". Appadurai claimed she would prioritize creating homes for homeless and vulnerable British Columbians, as well as ensuring residential buildings were equipped with sustainable cooling mechanisms. On October 13, Appadurai's campaign released a set of promises, including increasing the pay of nurses by 25%, providing free mental health care for all British Columbians, removing the three-month wait period for immigrants and returnees to receive healthcare, and implementing a provincial safe supply program. Several anonymous MLAs speaking to Global News expressed their frustrations with Appadurai, who they described as an "interloper" with "no role in [the NDP's] success".

On August 23, it was reported by the Vancouver Sun that Eby expressed his "frustration" with Appadurai's entry into the race. Eby commented that with Appadurai's entry, "it delays moving into the office by several months". If Eby was acclaimed, the race would potentially end on October 3, but the results would be released on December 3 with her entry. Following allegations of entitlement, Eby tweeted that he was "not dismissive of Anjali's campaign. Just the opposite — the race is healthier because she's put herself forward as a candidate and I take her campaign seriously."

It was alleged by the Vancouver Sun and by Appadurai's supporters that, by the end of the September 4 deadline for membership signups, the Appadurai campaign had signed up 10,000 new members to Eby's 6,000 new members.

=== Appadurai's disqualification ===
On September 8, 2022, the NDP began investigating allegations that Appadurai's campaign was violating BC's Election Act. Atiya Jaffar, a colleague of Appadurai's, was seen offering to pay for the $10 membership fee for individuals who were unable to afford to join the NDP during an Instagram Live event to rally supporters to join before the deadline. The BC NDP internally investigated potential breaches of the Election Act regarding membership fee payments. Under section 186 of the act, individuals may make political contributions using another's funds provided the source is disclosed and recorded against the correct limit. No formal complaint was registered with Elections BC, and the agency issued no ruling on whether any violation occurred. The party also reviewed whether Green Party members participated in the campaign, which is prohibited by both parties' constitutions. Appadurai stated that Jaffar misspoke, and the video in question was removed.

It was reported on September 16 that Appadurai's campaign was under investigation by both Elections BC and the NDP for potential violations under the Election Act. The investigation centred on whether Dogwood BC, a non-profit group that aims to increase the power of British Columbians over government decision-making, improperly contributed to Appadurai's campaign; the organization was accused of donating to Appadurai's campaign as well as using its resources in order to aid her campaign to sign up new members. Under the Election Act, only "eligible individuals" are able to provide political contributions, while organizations are barred from making any political contributions.

One complaint brought forward pertained to the "solicitation of fraudulent sign-ups of members from other parties", including claims that Dogwood BC told supporters to pause their previous party memberships in order to join the NDP to vote for Appadurai and re-join their original party following the race. Another issue under investigation were emails sent in support of Appadurai by a supporter and released by Jas Johal that told Green Party members to quit the party so that they could vote for Appadurai, and in the case that she lost, they could rejoin the Greens. If Appadurai's campaign was found to have violated rules for leadership or the Election Act, sanctions, including disqualification, were possible.

On October 7, CBC News reported that the Greens had turned down a request by the NDP for both parties to provide a neutral third party with the parties' membership lists in order to conduct an audit to determine whether any members had joined the NDP fraudulently. The Greens cited the party's privacy policy. The NDP released a statement expressing concerns that the Greens were "attempting a hostile takeover" of their party during its leadership election, reflecting poorly on the Greens and putting its registered party status at risk. Appadurai was critical of NDP efforts to vet new members, stating her belief that the party's "establishment is acting out of fear right now" and that the rhetoric used regarding a "hostile takeover" was concerning.

On October 19, a leaked report written by the NDP's chief electoral officer Elizabeth Cull concluded that the Appadurai campaign had improperly coordinated with third parties to sign up new members to the party. The report stated "no other remedy can adequately address the failings and breaches of the Appadurai Campaign" and recommended that her candidacy be disqualified. The conclusion was made on the grounds that individuals joined the party "fraudulently" and that the campaign violated the Election Act's limits on campaign spending. The report stated that, due to the participation of third parties in the campaign, it was "impossible to create a level playing field at this point, and impossible to restore the Leadership Election Campaign to a state of integrity in which [Cull] could have confidence". Cull's report centred on the participation of Dogwood BC and 350.org: that the two organizations were promoting membership sign-ups for the Appadurai campaign with paid social media ads, and that they had encouraged people "to fraudulently join the BC NDP despite being members or supporters of other political parties". Cull described the NDP membership list as being "tainted by fraudulent signups"; a spot check revealed 25.3 percent of new members were ineligible due to their prior support of or membership in another party, and another 2.5 percent of members were ineligible because of unpaid membership fees. The report detailed connections between Appadurai's campaign staff and members of Dogwood BC, which contradicted claims that the two campaigns were separate. Cull concluded that "aware of, accepted, relied upon, and took into account the membership drive activities of Dogwood in relation to its own campaign activities and strategies regarding the membership drive". The report also noted that despite Appadurai saying that she welcomed the audit and other measures to ensure the integrity of the leadership race, she was making "directly contradictory statements to the media".

In response to the leaked report, the Appadurai campaign launched a petition entitled "Let Her Run". Several members of the federal New Democratic Party expressed their criticism at the decision in Cull's report to disqualify Appadurai's candidacy, including Niki Ashton, Leah Gazan, Matthew Green, Lori Idlout, and Bonita Zarrillo. Former NDP MLAs Joan Sawicki, Harry Lali, and Tom Perry expressed their desire for the race to continue. Ontario MPP Joel Harden and former MPP Cheri DiNovo expressed their support for Appadurai's continued candidacy in the race.

On the evening of October 19, the NDP provincial executive voted to disqualify Appadurai's candidacy. With Appadurai disqualified, it meant that Eby would be acclaimed the leader of the NDP and become the premier-designate of British Columbia. In a press conference on October 20, Appadurai stated that she would stay in the NDP despite her disqualification and implored supporters to "fight from the inside" in order to "reshape" the party. Eby was officially declared leader on October 21.

== Candidates ==
=== Confirmed ===
==== David Eby ====
Attorney General of British Columbia (2017–2022) and MLA for Vancouver-Point Grey.

Endorsements of David Eby (43)
- Provincial and territorial politicians: (30)
  - Mike Farnworth (MLA for Port Coquitlam, deputy premier of British Columbia and minister of public safety and solicitor general)
  - Adrian Dix (MLA for Vancouver-Kingsway and minister of health)
  - Jennifer Whiteside (MLA for New Westminster and minister of education)
  - Ravi Kahlon (MLA for Delta North and minister of jobs, economic recovery and innovation)
  - Mitzi Dean (MLA for Esquimalt-Metchosin and minister of children and family development)
  - Lana Popham (MLA for Saanich South and minister of agriculture, food, and fisheries)
  - Harry Bains (MLA for Surrey-Newton and minister of labour)
  - Nicholas Simons (MLA for Powell River-Sunshine Coast and minister of social development and poverty reduction)
  - Melanie Mark (MLA for Vancouver-Mount Pleasant and minister of tourism, arts, culture, and sport)
  - Lisa Beare (MLA for Maple Ridge-Pitt Meadows and minister of citizens services)
  - Josie Osborne (MLA for Mid Island-Pacific Rim, minister of land, water, and resource stewardship and minister responsible for fisheries; former mayor of Tofino)
  - Rob Fleming (MLA for Victoria-Swan Lake and minister of transportation and infrastructure)
  - Bowinn Ma (MLA for North Vancouver-Lonsdale and minister of state for infrastructure)
  - Katrina Chen (MLA for Burnaby-Lougheed and minister of state for child care)
  - Sheila Malcolmson (MLA for Nanaimo, minister of mental health and addictions; former member of Parliament for Nanaimo—Ladysmith)
  - Fin Donnelly (MLA for Coquitlam-Burke Mountain, parliamentary secretary for fisheries and aquaculture; former member of Parliament for Port Moody—Coquitlam)
  - Grace Lore (MLA for Victoria-Beacon Hill and parliamentary secretary for gender equality)
  - Rachna Singh (MLA for Surrey-Green Timbers and parliamentary secretary for anti-racism initiatives)
  - Niki Sharma (MLA for Vancouver-Hastings and parliamentary secretary for community development and non-profits)
  - Ronna-Rae Leonard (MLA for Courtenay-Comox and parliamentary secretary for seniors)
  - Andrew Mercier (MLA for Langley and parliamentary secretary for skills training)
  - Kelly Greene (MLA for Richmond-Steveston and parliamentary secretary for the environment)
  - Dan Coulter (MLA for Chilliwack and parliamentary secretary for accessibility)
  - Bob D'Eith (MLA for Maple Ridge-Mission and parliamentary secretary for arts and film)
  - Adam Walker (MLA for Parksville-Qualicum and parliamentary secretary for the new economy)
  - Harwinder Sandhu (MLA for Vernon-Monashee)
  - Kelli Paddon (MLA for Chilliwack-Kent)
  - Aman Singh (MLA for Richmond-Queensborough)
  - Jinny Sims (MLA for Surrey-Panorama)
  - Henry Yao (MLA for Richmond South Centre)
- Members of Parliament (1)
  - Don Davies (MP for Vancouver Kingsway)
- Municipal politicians (7)
  - Kennedy Stewart (mayor of Vancouver)
  - Lisa Helps (mayor of Victoria)
  - Jonathan Coté (mayor of New Westminster)
  - Rob Martin (mayor of Colwood)
  - Sharie Minions (mayor of Port Alberni)
  - Aaron Stone (mayor of Ladysmith)
  - Jack Crompton (mayor of Whistler)
- Trade Unions (3)
  - CUPE BC
  - United Steelworkers Local 1-1937
  - MoveUP
- Other prominent individuals (2)
  - Stewart Phillip (grand chief of the Okanagan Nation and president of the Union of British Columbia Indian Chiefs)
  - Charlie Demers (comedian)
- Total endorsements: 43

=== Disqualified ===
==== Anjali Appadurai ====
Former NDP candidate for Vancouver Granville during the 2021 Canadian federal election.

Endorsements of Anjali Appadurai (13)
- Provincial and territorial politicians: (1)
  - Joel Harden (MPP for Ottawa Centre)
- Members of Parliament (2)
  - Bonita Zarrillo (MP for Port Moody—Coquitlam)
  - Niki Ashton (MP for Churchill-Keewatinook Aski)
- Municipal politicians (3)
  - Harold Steves (Richmond city councillor)
  - Laura Dupont (Port Coquitlam city councillor, former NDP candidate for Coquitlam—Port Coquitlam)
  - Ben Isitt (Victoria city councillor)
- Former members of Parliament (1)
  - Svend Robinson (former MP for Burnaby—Douglas)
- Other prominent individuals (3)
  - Avi Lewis (documentary filmmaker and UBC associate professor, former NDP candidate for West Vancouver—Sunshine Coast—Sea to Sky Country)
  - David Suzuki (academic, television broadcaster, and environmental activist)
  - Naomi Klein (author, journalist, documentary filmmaker, and co-director of UBC Centre for Climate Justice)
- Organizations (3)
  - Dogwood BC
  - 350 Canada
  - Sustainabiliteens
- Total endorsements: 13

=== Failed to qualify ===
==== Cherry Smiley ====
Researcher, women's rights advocate, and member of the Lower Nicola Indian Band.

== Declined ==
- Katrina Chen, minister of state for Child Care (2017–2022). Endorsed David Eby.
- Nathan Cullen, minister of Municipal Affairs (2022–2024)
- Adrian Dix, minister of Health (2017–2024), former party leader (2011–2014) Endorsed David Eby.
- Rob Fleming, minister of Transportation and Infrastructure (2020–2024). Endorsed David Eby.
- George Heyman, minister of Environment and Climate Change Strategy and minister responsible for TransLink. Endorsed David Eby.
- Ravi Kahlon, minister of Jobs, Economic Recovery and Innovation (2020–2022). Endorsed David Eby.
- Bowinn Ma, minister of state for Infrastructure (2020–2022). Endorsed David Eby.
- Melanie Mark, minister of Tourism, Arts, Culture and Sport (2020–2022). Endorsed David Eby.
- Josie Osborne, minister of Land, Water, and Resource Stewardship and minister responsible for Fisheries (2022). Endorsed David Eby.
- Selina Robinson, minister of Finance (2020–2022)
- Brad West, mayor of Port Coquitlam (2018–present)
- Jennifer Whiteside, minister of Education (2020–2022). Endorsed David Eby.

== Opinion polls ==
Support for Leadership candidates among NDP supporters
Polling firm	Dates conducted	Source	Eby	Appadurai	Other	Margin of error	Sample size	Polling method	Lead
Research Co.	October 7–11, 2022		42%	11%	No difference: 20%; Not sure: 26%	±3.5%	800	Online	31%
Leger	July 22–24, 2022		44%	–	Don't know: 50%; Other: 6%	±3.1%	1,000	Online	38%
