= Anjali Appadurai =

Canadian politician

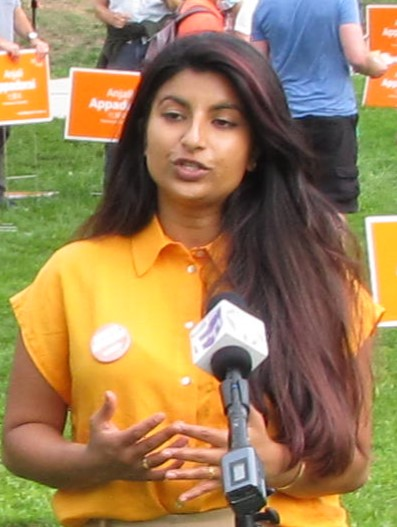
- Appadurai in 2021
- Born: May 27, 1990 (age 36); Madurai, Tamil Nadu, India
- Education: United World College, USA; College of the Atlantic (BA)
- Occupation: Activist
- Political party: New Democratic

Anjali Appadurai (born May 27, 1990) is a Canadian politician and climate activist.

== Early life and education ==
Appadurai's family immigrated to Canada from India and settled in Coquitlam, British Columbia, when she was six, to access better education.

Appadurai attended Gleneagle Secondary School in Coquitlam. She formed a global issues club in high school and became interested in trade issues and their relationship to climate justice.

Appadurai attended the United World College, a two-year international baccalaureate program in Montezuma, New Mexico. She obtained a Bachelor's degree in Global Politics, International Trade Law and Climate Policy from the College of the Atlantic in Maine.

== Climate activism ==
In 2011, at 21 years old, Appadurai spoke at the UN Climate Change Conference in Durban, South Africa.

In 2014, she worked for West Coast Environmental Law where she worked on the Sue Big Oil campaign. She also worked for the Sierra Club and the David Suzuki Foundation’s Climate Emergency Unit.

Appadurai was mentored by Martin Khor and Yeb Saño, the later of which she met at a UN Climate Conference in Warsaw in 2013.

== Politics ==
At age 31, Appadurai ran as the federal New Democratic Party candidate for Vancouver Granville in the 2021 election. She lost to Liberal candidate Taleeb Noormohamed by 431 votes.

Appadurai was the only challenger to David Eby, until she was disqualified, in the 2022 BC New Democratic Party leadership race. The BC NDP executive voted to disqualify her on the grounds of collusion with Dogwood BC, following a report by chief electoral officer Elizabeth Cull. Appadurai's involvement in the leadership race is thought to have prompted an estimated 14,000 individuals to become BC NDP members in 25 days, more than doubling the previous membership of 11,000.

Appadurai criticized BC NDP executive's decision and Cull's report, calling it: "an investigation to support a predetermined conclusion." She said it was "clearly a new interpretation" of the rules of a leadership contest and also called the decision to disqualify her “undemocratic” and a "nuclear option."

In 2026, Appadurai endorsed Avi Lewis in that year's federal NDP leadership race.

== Electoral history ==
2021 Canadian federal election: Vancouver Granville
Party	Candidate	Votes	%	±%	Expenditures
Liberal	Taleeb Noormohamed	17,050	34.40	+7.84	$104,987.86
New Democratic	Anjali Appadurai	16,619	33.53	+20.41	$58,609.98
Conservative	Kailin Che	13,280	26.80	+4.91	$72,350.92
Green	Imtiaz Popat	1,434	2.89	–2.17	$280.64
People's	Damian Jewett	1,177	2.37	+1.56	$3,075.03
Total valid votes/expense limit		49,560	99.34	–	$111,836.39
Total rejected ballots		331	0.66	+0.17	
Turnout		49,891	60.48	–3.74	
Eligible voters		82,491			
Liberal gain from Independent		Swing		—	
Source: Elections Canada
