= Alfred Scow =

Aboriginal British Columbian judge (1927–2013)

Alfred John Scow (born April 10, 1927, in Alert Bay, British Columbia, died Feb 26, 2013) was the first Aboriginal person to graduate from a BC law school, the first Aboriginal lawyer called to the BC bar and the first Aboriginal legally trained judge appointed to the BC Provincial Court.

Scow attended UBC where he completed 3 years of his undergraduate degree and was awarded an LLB degree.

Judge Scow received numerous awards including the UBC Great Trekker Award, Aboriginal Achievement awards, a UBC Honorary Doctor of Laws Degree in 1997, the Order of Canada in 2000, and the Order of British Columbia in 2004.

While at the University of British Columbia, Scow played for the Thunderbirds soccer team.

Scow was also a hereditary chief of the Kwikwasutinuxw of the Kwakwaka'wakw people.

He is the first cousin of Bill Wilson and uncle of Jody Wilson-Raybould.
