= Jody Wilson-Raybould =

Canadian politician (born 1971)

The Honourable Jody Wilson-Raybould PC OBC KC
- Puglaas
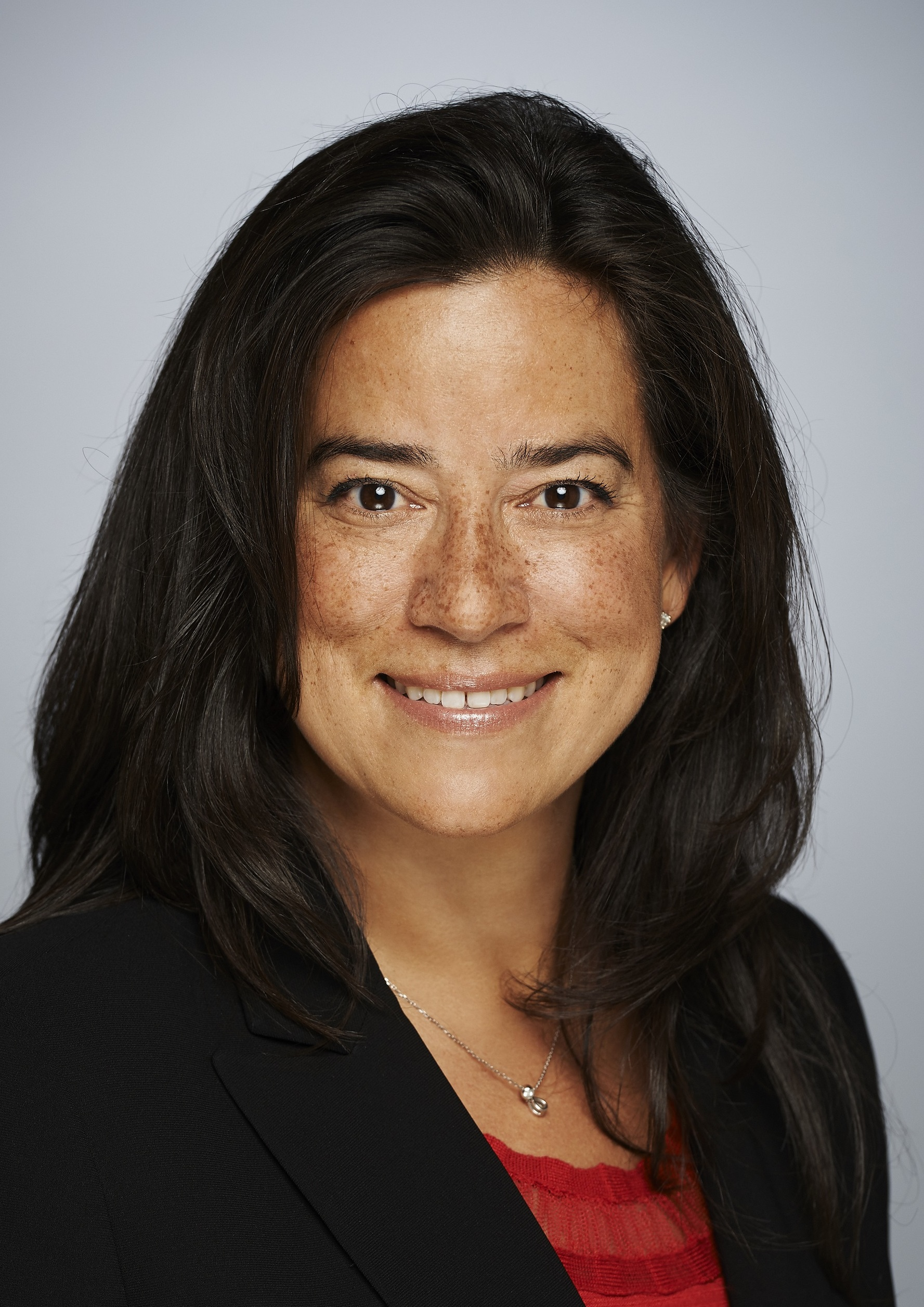

Minister of Veterans Affairs; Associate Minister of National Defence
- In office January 14 – February 12, 2019
- Prime Minister: Justin Trudeau
- Preceded by: Seamus O'Regan
- Succeeded by: Lawrence MacAulay

Minister of Justice Attorney General of Canada
- In office November 4, 2015 – January 14, 2019
- Prime Minister: Justin Trudeau
- Preceded by: Peter MacKay
- Succeeded by: David Lametti

Member of Parliament for Vancouver Granville
- In office October 19, 2015 – September 20, 2021
- Preceded by: Riding established
- Succeeded by: Taleeb Noormohamed

Personal details
- Born: Jody Wilson; March 23, 1971 (age 55) Vancouver, British Columbia, Canada
- Party: Independent
- Other political affiliations: Liberal (until April 2019)
- Spouse: Tim Raybould (m. 2008)
- Relations: Bill Wilson (father); Bev Sellars (stepmother); Alfred Scow (uncle)
- Education: University of Victoria (BA); University of British Columbia (JD)

Jody Wilson-Raybould PC OBC KC (born March 23, 1971), also known by her initials JWR and by her Kwak’wala name Puglaas, is an Indigenous Canadian lawyer, author, and former politician who was Minister of Justice and Attorney General of Canada from 2015 to 2019. First elected in the 2015 election as the member of Parliament (MP) for Vancouver Granville with the Liberal Party, Wilson-Raybould was re-elected as an independent in the 2019 election. As Attorney General, Wilson-Raybould refused to offer a deferred prosecution agreement to SNC-Lavalin after being pressured to do so by Prime Minister Justin Trudeau. She briefly served as Minister of Veterans Affairs in 2019, before she resigned from Cabinet and was removed from the Liberal caucus amid the SNC-Lavalin affair.

Before entering federal politics, she was a provincial Crown attorney in British Columbia (BC), a treaty commissioner and regional chief of the BC Assembly of First Nations.

== Early life and education ==
Wilson-Raybould's mother is a Euro-Canadian and her father is a descendant of the Musgamagw Tsawataineuk and Laich-kwil-tach peoples, which are part of the Kwakwakaʼwakw, also known as the Kwak’wala-speaking peoples. She is a member of the We Wai Kai Nation. Wilson-Raybould carries the Kwak’wala name Puglaas which roughly translates to "woman born to noble people".

Wilson-Raybould is the daughter of Bill Wilson (1944–2025), a First Nations hereditary chief, politician, and lawyer, and Sandra Wilson, a teacher. She has a sister named Kory. She was born at Vancouver General Hospital. On Canadian national television in 1983, Wilson-Raybould's father informed then-Prime Minister Pierre Elliott Trudeau that his two daughters hoped to become lawyers and then Prime Minister some day. Her parents divorced when Wilson-Raybould was a small child and she was raised by her mother on Vancouver Island, attending Robert Scott Elementary School in Port Hardy, British Columbia, where her mother also taught, and later Comox, British Columbia, graduating from Highland Secondary School. Her father later remarried Bev Sellars. She has two paternal half-brothers, Corey and William. Her uncle Alfred Scow is the first Aboriginal person to graduate from a BC law school.

Wilson-Raybould studied political science and history at the University of Victoria where she was awarded her Bachelor of Arts degree in 1996. She then studied for a Juris Doctor from the University of British Columbia Faculty of Law.

== Career ==
=== Crown attorney (2000–2003) ===
Wilson-Raybould is a lawyer by profession and was called to the bar in 2000 after articling at the Vancouver law firm of Connell Lightbody. She was a provincial Crown attorney in Vancouver's Main Street criminal courthouse in the Downtown Eastside, Canada's poorest neighbourhood, from 2000 to 2003. Defence lawyer Terry La Liberté described her as a smart, fair, and skilled prosecutor who treated defendants with compassion, saying, "She has actually talked to the people who are affected. She has worked with these people and made choices about their future in a really meaningful way." Wilson-Raybould called it an eye-opening experience, saying, “I always knew that there was an over-representation of indigenous peoples and vulnerable people in the criminal justice system but it became certainly more pronounced to me being down there for almost four years." She also said her experience as a prosecutor reconfirmed her commitment to public service and its importance.

=== BC Treaty Commission ===
In 2003, she took a position as a process advisor at the BC Treaty Commission, a body established to oversee the negotiations of modern treaties between First Nations and the Crown. In 2004, she was elected commissioner by the chiefs of the First Nations Summit. She served as commissioner for nearly seven years, one and a half of which she spent as the acting chief commissioner, earning a reputation for bringing opposing sides together in the complex treaty negotiation process. City of Vancouver first-ever Aboriginal Relations Manager Ginger Gosnell-Myers, then a youth representative on roundtables Wilson-Raybould organized, said working with her as a young person "felt like I was being heard for the first time in a process that was normally exclusionary. She went out of her way to make sure that this diversity was reflected". As a Commissioner, she helped to advance a number of treaty tables, including Tsawwassen First Nation, which became the first in BC to achieve a treaty under the BC Treaty Process. Wilson-Raybould also helped the establishment of a "Common Table" of 60 plus First Nations and the Crown.

=== We Wai Kai Council ===
Wilson-Raybould was elected to council for the We Wai Kai Nation in January 2009, a role that she credits for strengthening her understanding and commitment to work at the provincial and national level advocating for First Nations' governance. As a councillor for We Wai Kai she was instrumental in helping her community develop a land code and to move out from under the Indian Act. As a result of this work she was appointed as her nation's representative to the national First Nations Lands Advisory Board (LAB), and was subsequently elected from among her peers to sit as a board member for the LAB as well as a member of the finance committee.

As councillor for We Wai Kai Nation, Wilson-Raybould was also central to We Wai Kai developing a financial administration law (establishing a transparency and accountability through regulatory framework for establishing budgets and controlling expenditures), assuming property taxation powers under the First Nations Fiscal Management Act and becoming a borrowing member of the First Nations Finance Authority (FNFA). Wilson-Raybould was appointed the We Wai Kai representative to the FNFA. The borrowing members of the FNFA elected Wilson-Raybould as chair in 2013, 2014 and 2015. The FNFA is a not-for-profit that pools the public borrowing requirements of qualifying First Nations and issues bonds on the strength of a central credit. Under Wilson-Raybould, the FNFA issued its inaugural debenture in 2014 in the amount $96 million. This issue was reopened in 2015 adding an additional $50 million.

=== BC Assembly of First Nations ===
Wilson-Raybould was first elected regional chief of the BC Assembly of First Nations in 2009. The regional chief is elected by the 203 First Nations in BC. She is credited with bringing the chiefs together, which was reflected in her being re-elected regional chief in November 2012. She won on the first ballot with nearly 80 per cent of the vote.

As regional chief, Wilson-Raybould concentrated on the need for nation building, good governance, and empowering indigenous peoples to take the practical steps necessary to implement the United Nations Declaration on the Rights of Indigenous Peoples and to realize the promise of the recognition of aboriginal and treaty rights in section 35 of the Constitution Act, 1982. She focused on reconciliation between First Nations and the province of BC and Canada by advancing 1) the cause of First Nations' strong and appropriate governance, 2) fair access to lands and resources, 3) improved education and 4) individual health. In 2011 and 2012, Wilson-Raybould co-authored the BCAFN Governance Toolkit: A Guide to Nation Building. Part 1 of the Governance Toolkit – The Governance Report, which has been acclaimed as the most comprehensive report of its kind in Canada, setting out what First Nations in BC are doing with respect to transitioning their governance from under the Indian Act to a post-colonial world based on recognition of aboriginal title and rights.

In 2012, Wilson-Raybould and the BCAFN launched Part 2 of the Governance Toolkit – The Governance Self-Assessment and Part 3 – Guide to Community Engagement: Navigating Our Way Beyond the Post-Colonial Door. In 2014, a second edition of The Governance Report was released. In 2015, Wilson-Raybould and the BCAFN released A User's Guide to the BCAFN Governance Toolkit: Supporting Leaders of Change.

Wilson-Raybould held portfolio responsibilities on the Assembly of First Nations national executive for governance and nation building, the Chiefs Committee on Claims (including additions to reserve and specific claims) and chaired the comprehensive claims joint working group. During her first terms as Regional Chief, Wilson-Raybould worked with colleagues, including Senator Gerry St. Germain to introduce Bill S-212, the First Nations Self-Government Recognition Act. This Senate public bill would have provided a mechanism for First Nations to be recognized by the federal government as "self-governing" following the development of an internal constitution and after a community ratification vote on a self-government proposal. The bill died on the order paper.

Wilson-Raybould participated in the 2012 Crown–First Nations Gathering, delivering a strong message on the need to resolve First Nations issues, including the need for governance reform and moving beyond the Indian Act to support a strong economy. In the wake of the Idle No More protests and despite criticism from some First Nation leaders, Wilson-Raybould participated in high-level talks with then Prime Minister Stephen Harper. She expressed concern that very little progress had been made nationally on First Nations' issues since the 2012 First Nations–Crown Gathering and suggested concrete solutions to these issues. She stated her message very straightforwardly as follows: societies that govern well simply do better economically, socially and politically than those that do not. Good governance increases societies' chances of meeting the needs of their peoples and developing sustainable long-term economic development, and that First Nations are no different.

Wilson-Raybould attributes the lack of progress by the Conservative government during this time as one of her motivations to run for the federal Liberals in the 2015 federal election.

=== Volunteering ===
Wilson-Raybould has served as a director of Capilano University. As a former board member for the Minerva Foundation for BC Women (2008–2010), Wilson-Raybould was instrumental in the development of the "Combining Our Strength Initiative" – a partnership of Aboriginal and non-Aboriginal women. In addition to her duties as director of the Lands Advisory Board and Chair of the First Nations Finance Authority, Wilson-Raybould has also been a director of the Nuyumbalees Cultural Centre since 2013.

Wilson-Raybould has spoken publicly on such topics as aboriginal law, treaties, the environment, financial transparency, good governance and reconciliation. Prior to federal politics, she made numerous presentations before parliamentary committees including the Senate Standing Committee on Human Rights, the Senate Standing Committee on Aboriginal Peoples and the House of Commons Standing Committee on Aboriginal Peoples and Northern Development. Wilson-Raybould has travelled extensively to work on Indigenous peoples' rights and leadership issues, including to the Philippines, Taiwan and Israel.

=== Author ===
Wilson-Raybould has published four books: From Where I Stand: Rebuilding Indigenous Nations for a Stronger Canada (2019), 'Indian' in the Cabinet (2021), and True Reconciliation (2022), Reconciling History: A Story of Canada, (2024).

== Federal politics ==
=== Nomination and candidacy ===
Wilson-Raybould was the co-chair of the 2014 Biennial Liberal Convention held in Montreal, Quebec, Canada. She secured the nomination for Vancouver Granville on July 31, 2014. Wilson-Raybould was seen to be close to Liberal leader Justin Trudeau who approached her to run for the Liberals during the 2013 AFN Annual General meeting in Whitehorse. Her areas of core policy concern and competence include: democratic reform, balancing the environment and the economy, Aboriginal affairs and affordable housing. Wilson-Raybould visited the Great Bear Rainforest with Justin Trudeau in 2014.

Following the announcement of the nomination, Chief Isadore Day of the Serpent River First Nation (located in Ontario) alleged that Wilson-Raybould had a conflict of interest by continuing to act as regional chief while holding the Liberal Party nomination. Wilson-Raybould denied that her decision to run gave rise to a conflict. In response to Chief Day's allegation, the BC Assembly of First Nations adopted a unanimous resolution in support of Wilson-Raybould and expressed full confidence that she would be able to continue to perform her duties as regional chief while also serving as a Liberal candidate. Numerous First Nations supporters rallied behind Wilson-Raybould on social media, calling her a figure who could make "changes from the inside" and harshly criticizing Chief Day for meddling in BC affairs. "Chief Isadore Day has time to write letters about B.C., while his own community struggles?" wrote one member of Serpent River First Nation in a Facebook post. Wilson-Raybould said she would take a leave of absence during the campaign and if a conflict did arise before then, she would resign.

Wilson-Raybould stepped down from the position of regional chief in June 2015 in accordance with the transition plan approved in September 2014 by consensus of the chiefs following her nomination.

=== 2015 election ===
Wilson-Raybould was elected in the October 19, 2015 general election, obtaining 43.9 per cent of the vote.

=== Minister of Justice and Attorney General (2015–2019) ===
Wilson-Raybould began serving as Minister of Justice and Attorney General of Canada (MOJAG) on November 4, 2015, becoming the first Indigenous person and third woman to hold the office. On November 12, 2015, Prime Minister Justin Trudeau gave Wilson-Raybould her mandate letter, which asked her to deliver on, among other matters, responding to the Supreme Court of Canada's decision on medical assistance in dying, reviewing the government's litigation strategy, conducting a review of the changes in the criminal justice system and sentencing reforms over the previous decade (including looking to increase the use of restorative justice processes and other initiatives to reduce the rate of incarceration amongst Indigenous Canadians), creating the process to legalize and strictly regulate cannabis, restoring a modern Court Challenges Program, introducing government legislation to add gender identity as a prohibited ground for discrimination under Canadian law, and reforming the Supreme Court of Canada nomination process to ensure that it is transparent, inclusive and accountable to Canadians. In December 2016, along with Ralph Goodale, the minister of public safety and emergency preparedness, she submitted the National Security Green Paper, "Our Security, Our Rights: National Security Green Paper, 2016", a consultation paper aimed at informing further public discussion on issues of national security.

During the first six months in office, she introduced major legislation on medical assistance in dying, one of her key mandate letter commitments. In collaboration with her colleague, Minister of Health Jane Philpott, Wilson-Raybould led the effort to pass Bill C-14, which received royal assent on June 17, 2016.

Wilson-Raybould also introduced Bill C-16, which amended the Canadian Human Rights Act to add gender identity and gender expression to the list of prohibited grounds for discrimination, which was another key mandate letter commitment. The legislation also amended the Criminal Code to extend protections against hate propaganda, and it received royal assent on June 16, 2017.

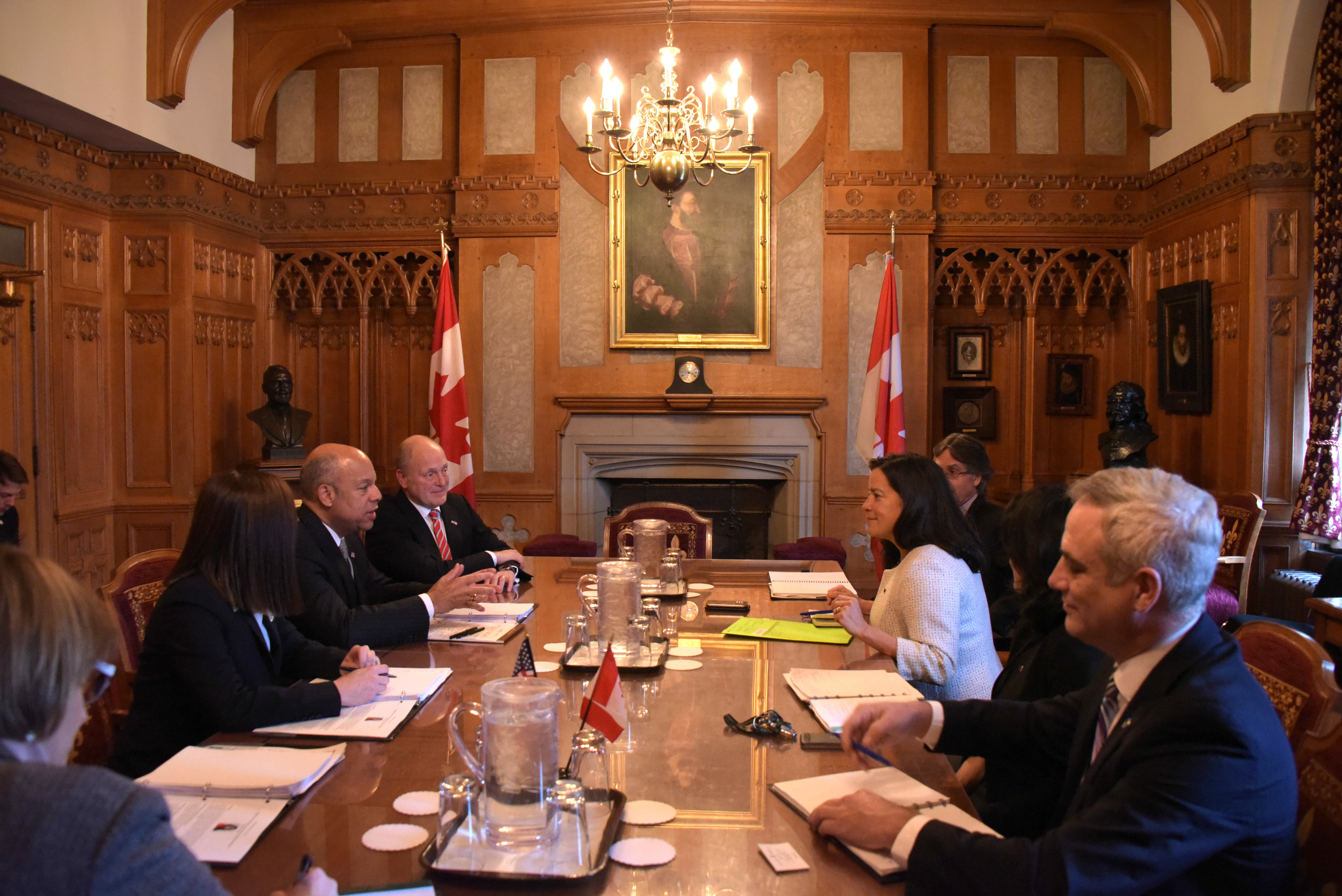
Meeting with US Secretary of Homeland Security Jeh Johnson in Ottawa on October 26, 2016

Her mandate letter called for a review of the government's litigation strategy to "end appeals or positions inconsistent with the government's commitments, the Charter of Rights and Freedoms, or Canadian values". As part of that commitment, on January 11, 2019, she issued the Directive on Civil Litigation Involving Indigenous Peoples. The directive guides the Government of Canada's legal approaches, positions and decisions taken in civil litigation involving Aboriginal and treaty rights, and the Crown's obligation towards Indigenous peoples. In 2017 she published the first-ever Litigation Year in Review with a subsequent edition in 2018.

In February 2017, Prime Minister Trudeau named Wilson-Raybould chair of the Working Group of Ministers on the Review of Laws and Policies Related to Indigenous Peoples, a Cabinet working group responsible for reviewing federal laws and policies that impact the rights of Indigenous peoples. Through consultation with Indigenous groups and experts, the Working Group adopted Principles respecting the Government of Canada's relationship with Indigenous peoples to guide their work. Those Principles were released on July 14, 2017, and have been the subject of considerable commentary. Wilson-Raybould authored an op-ed on the subject in The Globe and Mail and devoted a major speech to the Assembly of First Nations Annual General Assembly to the Principles and their importance.

As Minister of Justice, Wilson-Raybould introduced Bill C-45, the Cannabis Act on April 13, 2017. After passage by Parliament in June 2018, it enabled the nationwide legalization of cannabis in October of the same year. The passage of C-45 makes Canada the second country to legalize the recreational use of cannabis. The new law legalizes, strictly regulates and controls access to cannabis and came into force on October 17, 2018.

On April 13, 2017, Wilson-Raybould also introduced Bill C-46, which is the most comprehensive reform to the Criminal Code transportation regime in more than 40 years, including to drug and alcohol-impaired driving. The reforms were said to create a new, modern, simplified, and more coherent system to better deter and detect drug- and alcohol-impaired driving. Bill C-46 was notable for bringing forward limits for drug-impaired driving and allowing mandatory roadside alcohol screening. The bill received royal assent in June 2018.

As part of her mandate to "undertake modernization efforts to improve the efficiency and effectiveness of the criminal justice system", Wilson-Raybould introduced Bill C-75, a package of law reforms to deal with delays in the criminal justice system. The bill also included other pieces of legislation which had not advanced past first reading in the House of Commons. Those included bills C-28 (Victim Surcharge), C-38 (Human Trafficking), and C-39 (Charter Cleanup). Bill C-75 addresses areas such as bail reform, administration of justice offences, changes to preliminary inquiries, jury selection and reclassification of offences. Bill C-75 included an amendment to end the use of peremptory challenges. The introduction of the bill came shortly after a controversial decision rendered in the Gerald Stanley trial. Gerald Stanley, a non-indigenous farmer, was acquitted in the shooting death of Colton Boushie, a 22-year-old Cree man, in Battleford, Saskatchewan. The decision was rendered by an all-white jury after the few potential jurors with Indigenous ancestry who reported for jury duty were eliminated through peremptory challenges. Wilson-Raybould's tweet in response to the verdict sparked significant controversy with claims of undermining the justice system by questioning the jury's verdict, while others supported her empathy, and commitment to ensuring justice for all Canadians. Wilson-Raybould continued to oversee broad reforms and a review of the criminal justice system in Canada.

Wilson-Raybould also introduced Bill C-51, which received royal assent and came into force on December 13, 2018. Bill C-51 was the first update to sexual assault laws in over 25 years. It clarifies the law of sexual assault and addresses concerns about how the law is applied in practice. In addition, it repeals Criminal Code provisions struck down by Canadian courts and codifies certain Supreme Court jurisprudence. Bill C-51 amended the Department of Justice Act to create an obligation for the government to table a Charter Statement for every piece of proposed legislation outlining its impact on the rights protected in the Canadian Charter of Rights and Freedoms.

In May 2018, Wilson-Raybould introduced Bill C-78, the first major amendments to Canadian family law in over 20 years. She said Bill C-78 aims to promote the best interests of the child and make Canada's family justice system more accessible and efficient, while addressing issues such as child poverty, access to justice and family violence. This legislation complements the judicial resources for Unified Family Courts announced in Budget 2018, which is a commitment in the Mandate Letter of the Minister of Justice and Attorney General of Canada.

In her role as Minister of Justice and Attorney General of Canada, Wilson-Raybould also introduced Bill C-84, An Act to amend the Criminal Code (bestiality and animal fighting) on October 18, 2018. The changes brought forward in this legislation aim to amend Section 160 of the Criminal Code, which adds a definition of bestiality as any contact for sexual purpose between a person and an animal. Bill C-84 also amends Section 445.1(1)(b) and 447, which amend current and existing laws pertaining to animal fighting. The new amendments seek to include the breeding or training of an animal to fight another animal, the building or maintenance of an arena for animal fighting, or the promoting, arranging or receiving money for the fighting of animals as offences under this section of the Criminal Code.

In October 2016, Wilson-Raybould oversaw changes to the process for appointing judges across Canada, with the stated goal of ensuring the process "is transparent and accountable to Canadians, and promotes greater diversity on the bench". For instance, the government introduced changes to the structure and composition of the Judicial Advisory Committees, which are tasked with evaluating candidates who apply to the bench. In addition, the government began collecting and publishing demographic statistics related judicial applicants and appointees. In June 2018, it was reported that the government had been "naming women to the bench at an unprecedented rate". Wilson-Raybould introduced a new process for appointments to the Supreme Court of Canada. The government has taken the position that justices appointed to the Supreme Court of Canada must be functionally bilingual. The first justice appointed under the new process, Justice Malcolm Rowe from Newfoundland and Labrador, was sworn in on October 31, 2016. Prime Minister Justin Trudeau announced the name of his second appointment to the Supreme Court of Canada, Justice Sheilah Martin from Alberta, on November 29, 2017.

In 2018, Wilson-Raybould ordered an internal and external review of the extradition of Hassan Diab to France. The extradition had occurred under one of her predecessors, Rob Nicholson. Diab's lawyer, Donald Bayne, criticized the internal review, saying the justice department lawyer conducting the internal review was in a conflict of interest because he had played a role in the extradition. Murray Segal, former attorney general of Ontario, was appointed to conduct the external review. He completed his review after Wilson-Raybould had ended her tenure as attorney general. The review cleared Canadian prosecutors of any wrongdoing, but also made recommendations to improve the extradition process. Bayne called the review a "whitewash".

Wilson-Raybould was also criticized by the lawyer for Glen Assoun, who said she delayed for 18 months in acting on a Justice Department recommendation that he receive a new trial. Her successor, David Lametti, recommended a new trial, which ultimately led to Assoun's release. In addition, the prosecutor, Mark Scott, at Assoun's new trial, referenced what he called the "considerable period of time since the minister's decision has been pending."

Upon her move to the Department of Veterans Affairs Canada, Wilson-Raybould issued a public statement which outlined her milestones as the former minister of justice and attorney general and stated that an attorney general must be "non-partisan, more transparent in the principles that are the basis of decisions, and, in this respect, always willing to speak truth to power".

=== Minister of Veterans Affairs (2019) ===
On January 14, 2019, Trudeau made a cabinet shuffle, assigning Wilson-Raybould the veterans affairs portfolio. The move was seen as a demotion, and initially believed to be related to Wilson-Raybould's positions on Indigenous reconciliation; Don Martin, host of CTV News Channel's Power Play called it a 'hit job' and suggested it could be due to her criticism of the pace of reconciliation under the Trudeau government, while the president of the Union of BC Indian Chiefs, Grand Chief Stewart Phillip called the decision "disappointing and disturbing", saying "[the] removal of these critical and well-respected ministers, during a period of significant conflict and tension, demonstrates Trudeau's lack of resolve to address Canada's deplorable relationship with Indigenous peoples." In a written statement, Wilson-Raybould said she would not talk about the shuffle, but did talk about her work as minister of justice, about the unique responsibilities of the dual minister of justice and attorney general role in Canadian government, and about the importance of avoiding the appearance of political interference.

She resigned from the Trudeau cabinet on February 12, 2019.

=== SNC-Lavalin affair ===
On February 8, 2019, The Globe and Mail reported that sources close to the government said that the Prime Minister's Office allegedly had attempted to influence Wilson-Raybould concerning an ongoing prosecution of SNC-Lavalin while she was Minister of Justice and Attorney General. When asked about the allegations, Justin Trudeau said that the story in The Globe and Mail was false and that he had never "directed" Wilson-Raybould concerning the case. Wilson-Raybould did not comment on the matter, citing solicitor-client privilege. She resigned from the Trudeau cabinet on February 12. Trudeau said he did not anticipate her resignation and expressed disappointment over her decision, as it was not reflective of the conversations they had had during their recent meetings. Following Wilson-Raybould's resignation, Trudeau expressed his opinion that his government abided by all rules, did its job properly, and that if anyone within the government – including the former attorney-general – felt otherwise, the responsibility lay with Wilson-Raybould to address these concerns directly to him or the conflict of interest and ethics commissioner. She retained Thomas Albert Cromwell as counsel in order to determine the scope of information she was allowed to share with the public.

Support came from across Canada on social media, with #StandWithJody making 463,000 impressions between the February 14 and 24, while her popular credibility on this issue had reached 73 per cent, according to a February 14 Public Square Research poll.

On February 20, Wilson-Raybould addressed the House of Commons with the hope to "have the opportunity to speak my truth". On February 27, Jody Wilson-Raybould gave extended testimony to the House of Commons justice committee on this matter.

On March 25, CTV News reported that relations between Wilson-Raybould and the Prime Minister first began to fray in 2017, when Trudeau disagreed with a recommendation by Wilson-Raybould to appoint the conservative Manitoba judge Glenn Joyal to the Supreme Court of Canada. The report was based on earlier reporting by The Canadian Press which relied on "well-placed" anonymous sources. Wilson-Raybould denied to CTV News that there was any conflict over the Supreme Court recommendation. The report suggests the Prime Minister could have had reasons unrelated to the SNC-Lavalin affair for moving Wilson-Raybould out of the Justice portfolio. In his column in the National Post, Andrew Coyne questioned this conclusion, pointing out that Trudeau had originally claimed Wilson-Raybould would "still be [Attorney-General] today" had Scott Brison not resigned and necessitated a cabinet shuffle.

Conservative MP Peter Kent called the leak a "disgusting act of desperation" and said it could only have come from someone who had or was currently working in the Prime Minister's Office. Paul Wells of Maclean's also accused the Trudeau government of being the source of the leak. He further suggested the leak was an attempt to damage Wilson-Raybould and as an excuse to remove her from the Liberal caucus in the future. Following publication of details of the judicial appointment process, Wilson-Raybould condemned the leaks and called for an independent investigation. Trudeau initially refused to deny his office was involved in the leaks. The following day, he said his office did not play "any part in leaking".

On March 29, a telephone call, secretly recorded by Wilson-Raybould, between herself and Privy Council Clerk Michael Wernick, was released wherein Wernick told Wilson-Raybould that Trudeau wanted a deferred prosecution agreement for SNC-Lavalin "one way or another". The call accompanied a submission of forty pages supplementing her original testimony, including copies of texts and emails, outlining Wilson-Raybould's view of events.

On April 2, 2019, Trudeau expelled Wilson-Raybould from the Liberal caucus in the House of Commons and stripped her of the Liberal Party nomination for the 2019 Canadian federal election, referring to her secretly recording her conversation with the Privy Council Clerk as being "unconscionable". Opposition party leaders condemned the move, with Conservative leader Andrew Scheer saying, "if you tell the truth, there is no room for you in the Liberal Party". New Democratic leader Jagmeet Singh said that Wilson-Raybould tried to "put integrity and what's right for Canadians over what helps the Liberals" and that she "deserved better", and Green leader Elizabeth May said Wilson-Raybould had shown honour and integrity in her work, and that "the laws weren't broken because she held firm".

==== Ethics Commissioner's report ====
On August 14, 2019, Mario Dion, the conflict of interest and ethics commissioner, released a report that said Trudeau contravened section 9 of the Conflict of Interest Act by improperly pressuring Wilson-Raybould. The report details lobbying efforts by SNC-Lavalin to influence prosecution since at least February 2016, including the lobbying efforts to enact deferred prosecution agreement (DPA) legislation. The report analyses SNC-Lavalin's interests and finds that the lobbying effort advanced private interests of the company, rather than public interests. The report's analysis section discusses the topics of prosecutorial independence and the Shawcross doctrine (dual role of Attorney General) to draw the conclusion that the influence was improper and a violation of Conflict of Interest Act.

Responding to the report, Trudeau said he accepted it and took responsibility but disagreed with its findings. Andrew Scheer renewed his calls for a Royal Canadian Mounted Police (RCMP) investigation, while Elizabeth May and Jagmeet Singh reiterated their calls for an inquiry. An RCMP spokesperson declined to confirm or deny whether an investigation is underway, saying that the police force is carefully reviewing the facts and will take "appropriate actions as required".

After the report was made public, Wilson-Raybould released a statement saying it is a vindication of her positions on prosecutorial independence and the role of Attorney General. She stated that the report confirms that she acted appropriately at all times and that the staff of the Prime Minister's Office acted improperly.

=== 2019 election ===
Prior to her removal from caucus, Wilson-Raybould had said she would run as the Liberal candidate for Vancouver Granville in the 2019 federal election. When she was removed from the caucus, she was also stripped of the Liberal Party nomination. On May 27, Wilson-Raybould announced that she would run for re-election as an independent candidate.

On July 24, 2019, it was announced that Wilson-Raybould would be releasing a book about how to move forward with reconciliation with Indigenous peoples. The book, titled From Where I Stand, was released by UBC Press on September 20.

On October 21, 2019, Wilson-Raybould defeated Liberal candidate Taleeb Noormohamed by 3,177 votes, becoming the first woman to be elected as independent member to Canadian Parliament.

In July 2021, she announced her decision not to run in the 2021 Canadian federal election.

Her memoir, titled 'Indian' in the Cabinet: Speaking Truth to Power, was published September 14, 2021 by HarperCollins Canada, days before the 2021 Canadian federal election.

== Awards and recognition ==
In 2011, Wilson-Raybould was awarded a Minerva Foundation for BC Women award. In 2012, she received the distinguished alumni award from the University of Victoria. She has also been included in Vancouver Magazines "Power 50" (2012 and 2014). In 2015, Wilson-Raybould was selected by the Canadian Board Diversity Council as a Diversity 50 candidate, a list of Canada's most diverse board ready candidates.

On April 6, 2017, Wilson-Raybould received the inaugural Canadian Council for Aboriginal Business, Indigenous Women in Leadership Award. The 2018 award winner was Roberta L. Jamieson, the first First Nation woman in Canada to earn a law degree, and the president and CEO of Indspire.

Wilson-Raybould was featured in Paulina Cameron's 2017 book Canada 150 Women: Conversations with Leaders, Champions, and Luminaries which profiles the achievements and struggles of ground-breaking female role models.

In 2017, Wilson-Raybould was named Policy-Maker of the Year by the Macdonald-Laurier Institute. She was featured in their December 2017 edition of their magazine 'Inside Policy'.

In 2018, Wilson-Raybould was recognized by Harvard Women's Law Association as one of their 2018 International Women's Day Honourees and provided a keynote address at their annual event.

MADD Canada honoured Wilson-Raybould as the recipient of a 2018 Citizen of Distinction award for her outstanding efforts to strengthen Canada's impaired driving laws, and in particular her contributions to bringing forward Bill C-46. The Citizen of Distinction Award is presented annually to individuals, groups or organizations that have made a major provincial/territorial or national contribution to the anti-impaired driving movement in Canada, leaving a lasting legacy in the areas of research, prevention and education, legal issues or victim issues.

On March 7, 2018, Wilson-Raybould, alongside Judge Silvia Fernández de Gurmendi, the president of the International Criminal Court (ICC), unveiled an Inuit inukshuk which had been donated to the ICC by the Government of Canada to mark Canada's support for the ICC. The unveiling took place at the ICC's premises in The Hague.

Her book Indian in the Cabinet: Speaking Truth to Power was a nominee for the 2021 Balsillie Prize for Public Policy.

== Personal life ==
On November 29, 2008, she married Tim Raybould (b. 1966), a First Nations consultant, lobbyist and social anthropologist. In her 2021 memoir and in subsequent interviews, Wilson-Raybould shared that she and her husband faced challenges in starting a family due to multiple miscarriages. In January 2026, she announced that she had started treatment for breast cancer.

== Electoral record ==
2019 Canadian federal election: Vancouver Granville
Party	Candidate	Votes	%	±%	Expenditures
Independent	Jody Wilson-Raybould	17,265	32.56	–	$93,028.92
Liberal	Taleeb Noormohamed	14,088	26.57	–17.36	$100,753.33
Conservative	Zach Segal	11,605	21.88	–4.18	$91,186.16
New Democratic	Yvonne Hanson	6,960	13.12	–13.74	$25,666.28
Green	Louise Boutin	2,683	5.06	+1.92	$2,198.84
People's	Naomi Chocyk	431	0.81	–	$917.80
Total valid votes/expense limit		53,032	99.50	–	$108,561.11
Total rejected ballots		264	0.50	+0.15	
Turnout		53,296	64.22	–2.88	
Eligible voters		82,985			
Independent gain from Liberal		Swing		–	
Jody Wilson-Raybould was elected as a Liberal in 2015, but was expelled from the Liberal caucus on April 2, 2019, and sat as an independent.
Source: Elections Canada

2015 Canadian federal election: Vancouver Granville
Party	Candidate	Votes	%	±%	Expenditures
Liberal	Jody Wilson-Raybould	23,643	43.93	+13.83	$126,252.39
New Democratic	Mira Oreck	14,462	26.87	+2.42	$165,255.58
Conservative	Erinn Broshko	14,028	26.06	–9.31	$184,283.40
Green	Michael Barkusky	1,691	3.14	–6.08	$3,885.32
Total valid votes/expense limit		53,824	99.66	–	$212,795.60
Total rejected ballots		186	0.34	–	
Turnout		54,010	67.10	–	
Eligible voters		80,488			
Liberal notional gain from Conservative		Swing		+11.57	
Source: Elections Canada

29th Canadian Ministry (2015–2025) – Cabinet of Justin Trudeau
Cabinet posts (2)
Predecessor	Office	Successor
Seamus O'Regan	Minister of Veterans Affairs; 2019	Lawrence MacAulay
Peter MacKay	Minister of Justice; 2015–2019	David Lametti
