= Bill Wilson (chief) =

Canadian hereditary chief and politician (1944–2025)

Bill Wilson (1944 – January 25, 2025) was a Canadian hereditary chief, politician, and lawyer. He carried the Kwak’wala name Hemas Kla-Lee-Lee-Kla. Hemas means “the Chief who is always there to help” and Kla-Lee-Lee-Kla means “the first rank among the eagles.” He was a descendant of the Musgamgw Tsawataineuk and Laich-kwil-tach peoples, which are part of the Kwakwaka'wakw, also known as the Kwak’wala-speaking peoples.

== Personal life ==
Wilson was born in 1944 in Comox, British Columbia and was the son of Puugladee (also known as Ethel or Effery), the eldest child of a hereditary chief and a hamatsa, a position of very high stature in Kwakiutl culture. Wilson’s father, Charlie Wilson, was the eldest of six and supported his siblings while growing up. He died at age 62 from diabetes complications.

Wilson was a descendant of the Musgamagw Tsawataineuk and Laich-kwil-tach peoples, which are part of the Kwakwakaʼwakw, also known as the Kwak’wala-speaking peoples. They traditionally live on northern Vancouver Island, along the inside passage, the Broughton Archipelago, and the mainland inlets, but are traditionally people of the sea.

Wilson was married to Sandra Wilson, a teacher. They later divorced. They had two daughters, Jody Wilson-Raybould, former Member of Cabinet in the Justin Trudeau government, and Kory Wilson, an Executive Director at the British Columbia Institute of Technology. Wilson's second wife was Bev Sellars, a Chief of the Xat’sull (Soda Creek) First Nations. Wilson had five grand-daughters. He died on January 25, 2025, at the age of 80.

== Education ==
Wilson studied at the University of Victoria where he was awarded his Bachelor of Arts degree in 1970. He then studied at the University of British Columbia (UBC) Faculty of Law where he received his law degree in 1973. He was the second Indigenous person to graduate from UBC’s law school. The first was Wilson’s first cousin, Alfred Scow, who graduated in 1961. Scow also went on to become the first Indigenous lawyer in British Columbia, and the first Indigenous judge appointed to the BC Provincial Court.

== Political career ==
Wilson served as director of the Union of British Columbia Indian Chiefs from 1970 to 1973. In his third year of law school, Wilson was the director of Aboriginal title and land claims for the BC Association of Non-Status Indians. This organization was later renamed United Native Nation where Wilson presided as founding president from 1976 to 1981. From 1982 to 1983, Wilson was the vice-president of the Native Council of Canada, known now as the Congress of Aboriginal Peoples, and was its spokesmen at the 1983 First Ministers Conference.

In March 1983, Wilson and other Indigenous leaders met with Prime Minister Trudeau and successfully negotiated the only amendment to Canada’s new Constitution. This amendment is Section 35 of the Constitution Act which enshrined Indigenous title to traditional lands, and treaty rights and established equality of Indigenous women. During these negotiations, Wilson famously stated on Canadian national television that he hoped his two daughters would one day become lawyers and one of them maybe even the Prime Minister.

In 1988, Wilson helped found the BC First Nations Congress, whose aim was to help coordinate land claims negotiations and settlements, and was elected its chairman. In 1990, the organization changed its name to First Nations Summit and met with Prime Minister Brian Mulroney to discuss land claims issues. In 1992, Wilson, Mulroney and Premier of British Columbia Mike Harcourt signed an agreement that created the BC Treaty Commission.

In 1990, he made a claim that in 1983, he had been "well positioned" to become the next Prime Minister of Canada.

At the end of his political career, Wilson was the coordinator of the Musgamagw Tribal Council of the Kwagiulth nation. He was a Hamatsa, thus granted the name Hemas Kla-Lee-Lee-Kla, a recognition of his worthiness and his achievements that have led to his right to be a Hamatsa and a Chief of his tribe.
