= Bev Sellars =

Xat'sull-Canadian writer

- Born: 1955 (age 70–71); Soda Creek, British Columbia,
- Occupations: First Nations chief, writer
- Spouse: Bill Wilson (died 2025)
- Relatives: Jody Wilson-Raybould (stepdaughter)
- Writing career
- Period: 1980s–present
- Notable work: They Called Me Number One

Bev Sellars (born 1955) is a Xat'sull writer of the award-winning book, They Called Me Number One: Secrets and Survival at an Indian Residential School, describing her experiences within the Canadian Indian residential school system. She is also a longtime-serving Chief of the Xat'sull (Soda Creek) First Nations.

== Personal life ==
She was married to Bill Wilson and is the stepmother of Jody Wilson-Raybould.

== Education ==
Sellars was a student at the St. Joseph's Residential School in Williams Lake, British Columbia. She later studied history at the University of Victoria, and law at the University of British Columbia. She was named a distinguished alumna of the University of Victoria in 2016–2017.

== Career ==
Sellars served as chief of Xat'sull First Nation at Soda Creek, British Columbia, in 1987–1993 and again from 2009–2015. She was also an advisor to the British Columbia Treaty Commission.

In 1991, Sellars gave an address to the First National Conference on Residential Schools about her experiences and the long-lasting impact on First Nations peoples. This address is reproduced in its entirety in the book "Victims of Benevolence: The Dark Legacy of the Williams Lake Residential School," by Elizabeth Furniss.

In 2012, Sellars published "They Called Me Number One:Secrets and Survival at an Indian Residential School" recounting her childhood experience at St Joseph's and how that experience had and continues to have lasting impacts on her and her family's lives. Her memoir exposed the injustices and cruelties of the Canadian Indian residential school system. The book won the 2014 George Ryga Award for Social Awareness, and was shortlisted for the 2014 Hubert Evans Non-Fiction Prize.

In the same year, 2014, the dam breach at the Mount Polley mine happened. Sellars was the Xat'sull acting chief at the time and she has worked since then to bring attention to the conflicts between mining and First Nations communities in British Columbia as well as the rest of Canada.

In 2016, she published "Price Paid: The Fight for First Nations Survival" that examines the history of Indigenous rights in Canada from an Indigenous perspective.

She is involved with First Nations Women Advocating Responsible Mining and a Senior Leader of the Indigenous Leadership Initiative.

She has brought private charges against Mount Polley Mining Corporation and she continues to speak about the effects of the Mount Polley tailings spill on her community, warning other communities of potential risks from mining activities.

== Honours and awards ==
Sellars' book They Called Me Number One, published in 2013, was on the British Columbia Bestsellers list for 44 weeks. The book was also a finalist in both the First Nation Communities READ – Periodical Marketers of Canada Aboriginal Literature award (2017–2018) and Hubert Evans Non-Fiction Prize (2014), in addition to being a finalist for the Burt Award for First Nations, Métis, and Inuit Literature (2014).

The University of Victoria, where she earned her degree in history in 1997, declared her a Distinguished Alumni for 2016–2017.

CBC Books named They Called Me Number One as one of 15 memoirs by Indigenous writers you need to read in 2017.
