= Xatśūll First Nation =

First Nations government

Xatśūll First Nation formerly known as Soda Creek Indian Band, is a First Nations government of the Secwepemc (Shuswap) Nation, located in the Cariboo region of the Central Interior region of the Canadian province of British Columbia. It was created when the government of the then-Colony of British Columbia established an Indian reserve system in the 1860s. It is a member government of the Northern Shuswap Tribal Council.

In the Shuswap language, Soda Creek is called Xatsʼull, while Deep Creek is Cmetemʼ Xatʼsull, means "on the cliff where the bubbling water comes out".

One of the many First Nation's Chiefs has been Bev Sellars, a lawyer and writer who was a finalist for the Burt Award for First Nations, Métis and Inuit Literature in 2014 for her Indian residential schools memoir They Called Me Number One.

The Xatʼsull/Cmetemʼ First Nation, despite being created by the laws of the government of the former Colony of British Columbia, insists that because it has not signed any treaty with any political entity of the provincial or federal governments, it has not 'ceded' territorial claims. As part of the Northern Secwepemc te Qelmucw (Tribal Council), Xatʼsull/Cmetemʼ First Nation has been in negotiation with the government of Canada and the government of British Columbia regarding a final treaty settling this matter. An "Agreement in Principle" was signed in 2018. Once a final agreement is signed between the Tribal Council, Canada, and British Columbia, it is expected that the Indian Reserves will be abolished, the territories under jurisdiction of Xatʼsull/Cmetemʼ First Nation will expand significantly, and former reserves will be absorbed into settlement land under sovereignty of Xatʼsull/Cmetemʼ First Nation.

== Indian Reserves ==
The Soda Creek/Deep Creek Band has only two Indian Reserves: As explained before, these reserves were unilaterally defined by the Government of British Columbia, and thus the Band has never retracted its claim on its territory. These reserves are expected to be abolished and absorbed into settlement lands, after the signing of a final agreement.

- Deep Creek Indian Reserve No. 2, 7 miles southeast of the mount of Deep (Hawks) Creek on the Fraser River, 1661.60 ha. 52°15′45″N 122°05′15″W
- Soda Creek Indian Reserve No. 1, on the left (E) bank of the Fraser River, 1 mile south of the Soda Creek BCR (CN) station, 431.10 ha. 52°19′00″N 122°16′00″W

== See also ==
- Northern Shuswap Tribal Council
- Canim Lake, British Columbia
- Soda Creek, British Columbia
