= Taleeb Noormohamed =

Canadian politician

Taleeb Noormohamed MP

Member of Parliament for Vancouver Granville
- Incumbent
- Assumed office September 20, 2021
- Preceded by: Jody Wilson-Raybould

Personal details
- Born: Taleeb Farouk Noormohamed Ottawa, Ontario, Canada
- Party: Liberal
- Education: Princeton University (A.B.) Harvard University (M.A.)
- Occupation: Politician

Taleeb Farouk Noormohamed MP (born October 8, 1976) is a Canadian politician and technology executive who has been the Member of Parliament for Vancouver Granville since 2021 as a member of the Liberal Party.

== Education and career ==
Noormohamed attended high school at St. George's School in Vancouver.

Noormohamed completed a Bachelor of Arts degree from Princeton University, via an independent concentration in International Relations and Islamic Civilizations. He began to study for a doctorate at Wolfson College, Oxford though did not complete his studies.

After completing his degree, Noormohamed worked for the federal government, first at the Privy Council Office, and then for Public Safety Canada, where he was the director of the review of the bombing of Air India Flight 182. He proceeded to serve as the Director of Partnerships for the 2010 Winter Olympics which were held in Vancouver.

Following the Olympics, Noormohamed was appointed by the Government of British Columbia to conduct a review of the province's service delivery model. The review found substantial areas of improvement and much of the report was subsequently redacted by the provincial government.

From 2011 until his election in 2021, he held senior executive roles in with a number of technology firms including Farfetch and VRBO. From 2018 to 2021, he was appointed to the board of directors for the Canadian Air Transport Security Authority (CATSA).

Noormohamed serves as a governor of the Confederation Centre of the Arts and as an advisory board member of the MacEachen Institute of Public Policy. He has served on the boards of Covenant House Vancouver, The Lions Gate Hospital Foundation, the Koerner Foundation, and the Leukemia and Lymphoma Society.

He is a recipient of the Queen's Diamond Jubilee Medal, the Sovereign's Medal for Volunteers.

== Political career ==
=== 2004 nomination bid ===
In 2004, Noormohamed challenged incumbent Hedy Fry, who had held the seat since 1993, for the nomination of the Liberal Party in Vancouver Centre.

During the race, Noormohamed suggested that public concerns about gay men having sex in municipal parks was less of a concern to him than the safety of those engaged in it, saying,“Do we have the ability to make it a safe space so people aren’t getting beat up, so people aren’t getting killed. To me, that’s more of an issue than whether or not a young family of four feels safe walking through Lee’s Trail at 3 o’clock in the morning.”

Fry defeated Noormohamed for the nomination and succeeded in winning a fourth term as MP.

=== 2011 and 2019 federal elections ===
In the 2011 federal election, Noormohamed unsuccessfully ran as the Liberal candidate in North Vancouver. He also ran in the 2019 federal election as the Liberal candidate in Vancouver Granville; however, he lost to incumbent Jody Wilson-Raybould who was elected as a Liberal but ran as an independent candidate.

=== 2018 Vision Vancouver mayoral candidacy ===
In 2018, Noormohamed announced his candidacy for the leadership of municipal political party Vision Vancouver, where a victory would effectively make Noormohamed the party's mayoral candidate in municipal elections.

He described the party as a "big tent for people who share centrist values", and cited his work helping start up companies as his inspiration for running in the race. He expressed a desire to improve transit and address the housing crisis through working with community organizations and exploring multi-generational housing. The Toronto Star raised questions about Noormohamed's extensive work history as an executive for short-term rental sites HomeAway (now Vrbo) and Tripping.com, to which Noormohamed responded by pointing out HomeAway's focus on vacation rentals rather than urban apartments.

In a Facebook message posted eight days after announcing his candidacy, Noormohamed stated he had been hospitalized after a "sudden cardiac event" and on the advice of doctors, made the difficult decision to "end this nomination campaign". At that time, he put his support behind the other Vision Vancouver candidate, Ian Campbell.

=== 2021 federal election ===
Noormohamed once again ran for the Liberal Party in Vancouver Granville during the 2021 federal election.

Initial news reports prompted criticism of Noormohamed when they revealed his purchase and sale of 4 properties within the previous 4 years.

He deflected concerns by suggesting the home purchases were intended for family members or himself, and when those plans fell through for various reasons, he was obliged to sell the properties.

Days later, new information revealed Noormohamed had purchased and sold a total of 41 properties in Vancouver since 2005, with 21 of those transactions taking place in under a year – a practice known as "flipping". The NDP released BC Assessment records and an accompanying spreadsheet showing Noormohamed's real estate speculation had netted almost $5 million since 2005 and nearly $3.7 million in the previous 6 years alone.

During the election campaign, Prime Minister Justin Trudeau, the Liberal leader, promised to introduce an anti-flipping tax as well as other anti-speculation measures to "crack down on predatory speculators". Noormohamed initially avoided questions on income he earned from flipping houses when asked if he had declared those as his principal residence, which would make gains on their sale non-taxable. He later stated, "I have always followed the appropriate rules around this." In an interview with CTV, Noormohamed declined to provide details on how much he had profited from a decade of home sales .

Subsequent to these news reports, Noormohamed was not in attendance at a September 13 all-candidates meeting for Vancouver South and Vancouver-Granville, hosted by the Jewish Seniors Alliance, Marpole Oakridge Family Place, South Vancouver Seniors Network, South Granville Seniors Centre, COSCO BC, and the BC Health Coalition. In addition, Noormohamed did not attend an all candidates meeting hosted by the Vancouver Unitarians on September 14, nor did he attend an on-air panel hosted by the local CBC radio affiliate on September 17.

During an interview on election eve, Noormohamed answered "No" to the question of whether he would continue the practice of real estate speculation if he won the seat.

=== In Parliament ===
Noormohamed is the first Muslim MP to be elected in British Columbia.

In August 2022, Noormohamed's disclosures indicated ownership of shares in a wide variety of companies, as well as multiple rental properties.

In 2023, he was appointed Parliamentary Secretary to the Minister of Canadian Heritage.

Noormohamed is a member of the Standing Committee on Public Safety and National Security (SECU) and the Standing Joint Committee for the Scrutiny of Regulations (REGS). Shortly after his election, he was elected chair of the Federal Liberal Pacific Caucus, composed of Liberal MPs from British Columbia.

Noormohamed was re-elected to the House of Commons in the 2025 election. He was named Parliamentary Secretary for Artificial Intelligence and Digital Innovation by Prime Minister Mark Carney.

On October 31, 2025, over 8 months after the 2025 election had been decided, a Members of the House of Commons' Compliance Status Report showed that Noormohamed failed to submit his financial disclosures to the Office of the Conflict of Interest and Ethics Commissioner (OCIEC), despite regulations stating that MP's must file their claims no later than 60 days after their notice of Election to the House of Commons. However, by January 1, 2026, the report showed that Noormohamed completed the initial compliance process.

== Electoral record ==
2025 Canadian federal election: Vancouver Granville
Party	Candidate	Votes	%	±%	Expenditures
Liberal	Taleeb Noormohamed	37,010	62.12	+24.89	$117,579.39
Conservative	Marie Rogers	17,133	28.76	+4.10	$131,321.98
New Democratic	Sukhi Singh Sahota	4,489	7.53	–25.38	$37,661.47
Green	Jerry Kroll	945	1.59	–1.14	$7,680.11
Total valid votes/expense limit		59,577	99.35	–	$132,281.75
Total rejected ballots		392	0.65	–0.01	
Turnout		59,969	69.07	+8.59	
Eligible voters		86,823			
Liberal notional hold		Swing		+10.40	
Source: Elections Canada

2021 Canadian federal election: Vancouver Granville
Party	Candidate	Votes	%	±%	Expenditures
Liberal	Taleeb Noormohamed	17,050	34.40	+7.84	$104,987.86
New Democratic	Anjali Appadurai	16,619	33.53	+20.41	$58,609.98
Conservative	Kailin Che	13,280	26.80	+4.91	$72,350.92
Green	Imtiaz Popat	1,434	2.89	–2.17	$280.64
People's	Damian Jewett	1,177	2.37	+1.56	$3,075.03
Total valid votes/expense limit		49,560	99.34	–	$111,836.39
Total rejected ballots		331	0.66	+0.17	
Turnout		49,891	60.48	–3.74	
Eligible voters		82,491			
Liberal gain from Independent		Swing		—	
Source: Elections Canada

2019 Canadian federal election: Vancouver Granville
Party	Candidate	Votes	%	±%	Expenditures
Independent	Jody Wilson-Raybould	17,265	32.56	–	$93,028.92
Liberal	Taleeb Noormohamed	14,088	26.57	–17.36	$100,753.33
Conservative	Zach Segal	11,605	21.88	–4.18	$91,186.16
New Democratic	Yvonne Hanson	6,960	13.12	–13.74	$25,666.28
Green	Louise Boutin	2,683	5.06	+1.92	$2,198.84
People's	Naomi Chocyk	431	0.81	–	$917.80
Total valid votes/expense limit		53,032	99.50	–	$108,561.11
Total rejected ballots		264	0.50	+0.15	
Turnout		53,296	64.22	–2.88	
Eligible voters		82,985			
Independent gain from Liberal		Swing		–	
Jody Wilson-Raybould was elected as a Liberal in 2015, but was expelled from the Liberal caucus on April 2, 2019, and sat as an independent.
Source: Elections Canada

2011 Canadian federal election: North Vancouver
Party	Candidate	Votes	%	±%	Expenditures
Conservative	Andrew Saxton	28,996	48.62	+6.37	$92,458.35
Liberal	Taleeb Noormohamed	17,665	29.62	–7.74	$79,708.34
New Democratic	Michael Charrois	9,617	16.13	+6.73	$10,614.54
Green	Greg Dowman	3,004	5.04	–5.66	$336.39
Independent	Nick Jones	350	0.59	–	$1,502.88
Total valid votes/expense limit		59,632	99.74	–	$93,241.88
Total rejected ballots		153	0.26	–0.02	
Turnout		59,785	66.86	+0.41	
Eligible voters		89,416			
Conservative hold		Swing		+7.06	
Source: Elections Canada
