= Vancouver Granville =

Federal electoral district in British Columbia, Canada

British Columbia electoral district
- Interactive map of riding boundaries from the 2025 federal election

Federal electoral district
- Legislature: House of Commons
MP
Taleeb Noormohamed
Liberal
- District created: 2013
- First contested: 2015
- Last contested: 2025
- District webpage: profile, map

Demographics
- Population (2021): 109,799
- Electors (2021): 82,070
- Area (km²): 22.40
- Pop. density (per km²): 4,901.7
- Census division: Metro Vancouver
- Census subdivision: Vancouver (part)

Vancouver Granville is a federal electoral district in British Columbia, Canada, that has been represented in the House of Commons of Canada since 2015. The district includes all or significant portions of the Kerrisdale, Marpole, Oakridge, Shaughnessy, South Cambie, Fairview and Riley Park–Little Mountain neighbourhoods. Based on the 2011 Canadian census data, the population of the district is 99,886.

== History ==
Vancouver Granville was created by the 2012 federal electoral boundaries redistribution and was legally defined in the 2013 representation order. It came into effect upon the call of the 42nd Canadian federal election, which happened in October 2015. It was created out of the electoral districts of Vancouver Centre (38%), Vancouver Quadra (18%), Vancouver Kingsway (19%) and Vancouver South (26%).

In April 2019, the district's first MP, Jody Wilson-Raybould, was expelled from the Liberal Party after clashing with Prime Minister Justin Trudeau over the SNC-Lavalin affair. Even though she was removed from the party, many of the riding's constituents continued to support her in the federal election as an Independent MP candidate. She subsequently won as an Independent in the 2019 federal general election, beating her nearest rival, the Liberal candidate, by almost 3,000 votes. In July 2021, Wilson-Raybould announced that she would not stand again for re-election.

== Demographics ==
Panethnic groups in Vancouver Granville (2011−2021)
Panethnic group	2021		2016		2011	
Panethnic group	Pop.	%	Pop.	%	Pop.	%
European (Note: Statistic includes all persons that did not make up part of a visible minority or an indigenous identity.)	50,120	46.17%	51,660	50.63%	49,625	50.55%
East Asian (Note: Statistic includes total responses of "Chinese", "Korean", and "Japanese" under visible minority section on census.)	37,745	34.77%	35,705	34.99%	34,915	35.57%
Southeast Asian (Note: Statistic includes total responses of "Filipino" and "Southeast Asian" under visible minority section on census.)	5,600	5.16%	4,835	4.74%	4,625	4.71%
South Asian	4,995	4.6%	3,330	3.26%	3,040	3.1%
Latin American	2,415	2.22%	1,060	1.04%	980	1%
Middle Eastern (Note: Statistic includes total responses of "West Asian" and "Arab" under visible minority section on census.)	1,965	1.81%	1,430	1.4%	1,340	1.36%
Indigenous	1,760	1.62%	1,490	1.46%	1,310	1.33%
African	1,215	1.12%	825	0.81%	940	0.96%
Other (Note: Statistic includes total responses of "Visible minority, n.i.e." and "Multiple visible minorities" under visible minority section on census.)	2,735	2.52%	1,690	1.66%	1,390	1.42%
Total responses	108,555	98.87%	102,030	98.62%	98,170	98.28%
Total population	109,799	100%	103,456	100%	99,886	100%
Notes: Totals greater than 100% due to multiple origin responses. Demographics based on 2012 Canadian federal electoral redistribution riding boundaries.

According to the 2021 Canadian census

Languages: 53.2% English, 11.1% Mandarin, 10.1% Cantonese, 2.1% Spanish, 1.8% Tagalog, 1.6% French, 1.4% Japanese, 1.4% Korean
Religions: 57.4% No Religion, 30% Christian (12.2% Catholic, 2.4% Anglican, 1.8% United Church, 1.3% Christian Orthodox), 3.6% Buddhist, 3% Jewish, 2.2% Muslim, 1.3% Hindu, 1.2% Sikh
Median income: $45,600 (2020)
Average income: $71,400 (2010)

== Geography ==
Vancouver Granville consists of that part of the City of Vancouver described as follows: commencing at the intersection of the southerly limit of said city with the southerly production of Cambie Street; thence northerly along said production and Cambie Street to 41st Avenue West; thence easterly along said avenue and 41st Avenue East to Main Street; thence northerly along said street to 16th Avenue East; thence westerly along said avenue to Ontario Street; thence northerly along said street to 2nd Avenue West; thence westerly and southwesterly along said avenue to 6th Avenue West; thence westerly along said avenue to 4th Avenue West; thence northwesterly and westerly along said avenue to Arbutus Street; thence southerly along said street to 37th Avenue West; thence easterly along said avenue to the Canadian Pacific Railway; thence southerly and southeasterly along said railway to the southerly production of Granville Street; thence southerly along said production to the southerly limit of said city; thence generally easterly along said limit to the point of commencement. While much of the riding's population resides in single family homes, massive redevelopment has occurred from Broadway all the way down the Cambie corridor to Marine Drive, with dense transit-oriented development popping up around stations of the Canada Line.

== Members of Parliament ==
This riding has elected the following members of the House of Commons of Canada:

Parliament	Years	Member	Party
Vancouver Granville; Riding created from Vancouver Centre, Vancouver Kingsway, Vancouver Quadra and Vancouver South
42nd	2015–2019	Jody Wilson-Raybould	Liberal
42nd	2019–2019	Jody Wilson-Raybould	Independent
43rd	2019–2021	Jody Wilson-Raybould	Independent
44th	2021–2025	Taleeb Noormohamed	Liberal
45th	2025–present	Taleeb Noormohamed	Liberal

== Election results ==
Graph of election results in Vancouver Granville (minor parties that never got 2% of the vote or didn't run consistently are omitted)

=== 2023 representation order ===
2025 Canadian federal election
Party	Candidate	Votes	%	±%	Expenditures
Liberal	Taleeb Noormohamed	37,009	62.12	+24.89	
Conservative	Marie Rogers	17,133	28.76	+4.10	
New Democratic	Sukhi Singh Sahota	4,489	7.53	–25.38	
Green	Jerry Kroll	945	1.59	–1.14	
Total valid votes/expense limit					
Total rejected ballots					
Turnout		59,576	69.00		
Eligible voters		86,346			
Liberal notional hold		Swing		+10.40	
Source: Elections Canada

2021 federal election redistributed results
Party	Vote	%
Liberal	19,873	37.23
New Democratic Party	17,570	32.91
Conservative	13,163	24.66
Green	1,457	2.73
People's	1,269	2.38
Others	50	0.09

=== 2013 representation order ===
2021 Canadian federal election
Party	Candidate	Votes	%	±%	Expenditures
Liberal	Taleeb Noormohamed	17,050	34.40	+7.83	$104,842.87
New Democratic	Anjali Appadurai	16,619	33.53	+20.41	$58,609.98
Conservative	Kailin Che	13,280	26.80	+4.92	$72,350.92
Green	Imtiaz Popat	1,434	2.89	−2.17	$280.64
People's	Damian Jewett	1,177	2.37	+1.56	$3,075.03
Total valid votes/expense limit		49,560	99.34	—	$111,836.39
Total rejected ballots		331	0.66	+0.17	
Turnout		49,891	60.79	−4.21	
Eligible voters		82,070			
Liberal gain from Independent		Swing		—	
Source: Elections Canada

2019 Canadian federal election
Party	Candidate	Votes	%	±%	Expenditures
Independent	Jody Wilson-Raybould	17,265	32.56	–	$97,203.39
Liberal	Taleeb Noormohamed	14,088	26.57	−17.36	$103,546.83
Conservative	Zach Segal	11,605	21.88	−4.18	$98,739.59
New Democratic	Yvonne Hanson	6,960	13.12	−13.75	$28,671.17
Green	Louise Boutin	2,683	5.06	+1.96	$2,198.84
People's	Naomi Chocyk	431	0.81	–	$917.80
Total valid votes/expense limit		53,032	100.0	–	$108,561.11
Total rejected ballots		264	0.49	+0.15	
Turnout		53,296	65.0	−3.23	
Eligible voters		81,952			
Independent gain from Liberal		Swing		–	
Jody Wilson-Raybould was elected as a Liberal in 2015, but was expelled from the Liberal caucus on April 2, 2019, and sat as an independent.
Source: Elections Canada

2015 Canadian federal election
Party	Candidate	Votes	%	±%	Expenditures
Liberal	Jody Wilson-Raybould	23,643	43.93	+13.83	$126,252.39
New Democratic	Mira Oreck	14,462	26.87	+2.42	$165,255.58
Conservative	Erinn Broshko	14,028	26.06	−9.31	$184,283.40
Green	Michael Barkusky	1,691	3.14	−6.08	$3,885.32
Total valid votes/expense limit		53,824	100.00		$212,795.60
Total rejected ballots		186	0.34	–	
Turnout		54,010	68.23	–	
Eligible voters		79,154			
Liberal notional gain from Conservative		Swing		+11.57	
Source: Elections Canada

2011 federal election redistributed results
Party	Vote	%
Conservative	15,440	35.38
Liberal	13,137	30.10
New Democratic	10,670	24.45
Green	4,026	9.22
Others	372	0.85

== See also ==
- List of Canadian electoral districts
- Historical federal electoral districts of Canada
