= Dogwood BC =

Canadian non-profit public interest group based in Victoria, British Columbia

- Founded: 1998; 28 years ago
- Location: Victoria, British Columbia
- Website: dogwoodbc.ca

Dogwood BC (formerly Dogwood Initiative) is a Canadian non-profit public interest group based in Victoria, British Columbia. The organization works to increase the power of British Columbians over government decision-making. They were instrumental in the fight against Enbridge's Northern Gateway pipeline, introducing a tanker moratorium on BC's north coast and the province's campaign finance reform. The organization currently works to stop Kinder Morgan's Trans Mountain tanker and pipeline expansion in BC, ban U.S. thermal coal exports through BC ports and restore accountability and transparency to the province's democracy by calling for a Corruption Inquiry.

== History ==
Conceived in the fourth quarter of 1998 at a meeting of First Nations, environmentalists, community advocates, and labour leaders, Dogwood Initiative began operating in 1999. The meeting took place on Bowen Island.

At first campaigns focused on logging. Dogwood campaigners worked to stop the privatization of nearly 300,000 acres of public land on Vancouver Island. They convinced the government to redistribute 10 per cent of MacMillan Bloedel’s logging tenures to First Nations and local communities. They helped limit raw log exports, launched the British Columbia Community Forest Association and used the Softwood Lumber dispute to reallocate 20 per cent of logging tenures across BC

As oil and gas began to replace logging as the government’s top priority, Dogwood began to adapt. Beginning in 2001, the Liberal government in Victoria began to fast-track fossil fuels, starting with coalbed methane. By blowing apart coal seams, companies like Royal Dutch Shell planned to release vast reserves of methane gas held in place by groundwater. Dogwood worked with activists and First Nations in Telkwa, Cache Creek, Smithers, Princeton, Fernie, Iskut, Dease Lake, and throughout the Peace Region, and were able to shut down commercial coalbed methane everywhere in BC. Dogwood was an early supporter of the Tahltan opposition to Shell’s massive coalbed methane plan in the Sacred Headwaters, which ended in a high-profile victory when Shell pulled out for good in 2012.

To date Dogwood is best known for their No Tankers campaign, aimed at stopping the expansion of oil tankers off British Columbia’s coast. What began as a small, focused campaign against Enbridge's Northern Gateway with northern First Nations grew into a political juggernaut that arguably contributed to the Harper government’s 2015 defeat, after the pro-tanker Conservative party lost more votes in BC than in the rest of the country combined. New Prime Minister Justin Trudeau cancelled the Northern Gateway pipeline and Liberal MP Joyce Murray introduced legislation for a tanker ban in the north coast of BC However, Prime Minister Trudeau broke his promise to British Columbians and approved Kinder Morgan's Trans Mountain pipeline expansion. Dogwood continues to work against the Texas-based pipeline company.

Dogwood also runs 'get out the vote' campaigns for elections in the province of BC In 2017, Dogwood volunteers worked across BC to raise awareness about their issues and increase voter turnout.

== Current campaigns ==
No Tankers

Dogwood is actively working against Texas-based Kinder Morgan's pipeline and tanker expansion project. The project is expected to increase the tanker traffic on the BC's coast seven-fold and actively violates the rights of First Nations and the will of local communities.

Beyond Coal

Dogwood is working to ban U.S. thermal coal exports in BC ports. Dogwood is calling for adequate health and environmental assessments and a levy on coal exports akin to the carbon tax Canadian companies must pay. In 2017, Premier Christy Clark joined the call for the levy on U.S. thermal coal coming through BC ports.

Ban Big Money

Dogwood was instrumental in the campaign for campaign finance reform in BC politics. The organization researched and released breaking stories, including how much Kinder Morgan donated to the governing BC Liberal party in advance of their approval of the company's project, tracking the donations from government contractors and donations from an American trophy hunter Super PAC. In November 2017, the provincial government passed laws to reform campaign finance, banning corporation, union and out-of-province donations and limiting individual contributions to $1,200.

== Criticism ==
Researchers and pundits affiliated with the fossil fuel industry have criticized Dogwood for accepting donations from US-based funders and charities, such as the Tides Foundation.

In an interview with journalist Markham Hislop, political scientist Keith Brownsey at Mount Royal University said such claims are "bordering on conspiracy theory".
