= Trudeau =

Trudeau is a surname. Notable people with the surname include:

- Trudeau family, a notable Canadian family known in politics, business and film, including:
  - Charles-Émile Trudeau (1887–1935), Canadian businessman and father of Pierre Trudeau
  - Pierre Trudeau (1919–2000), Prime Minister of Canada from 1968 to 1979 and from 1980 to 1984.
  - Margaret Trudeau (born 1948), divorced wife of Pierre Trudeau
  - Justin Trudeau (born 1971), Prime Minister of Canada between 2015 and 2025, son of Pierre and Margaret
  - Sophie Grégoire Trudeau (born 1975), estranged wife of Justin Trudeau
  - Xavier Trudeau (born 2007), Canadian singer, son of Justin and Sophie
  - Alexandre Trudeau (born 1973), Canadian film-maker, son of Pierre and Margaret
  - Michel Trudeau (1975–1998), son of Pierre and Margaret who died in an avalanche
- Angus Trudeau (1905–1984), Anishinaabe artist
- Arthur Trudeau (1902–1991), Lieutenant General in the United States Army
- Catherine Trudeau (born 1975), Quebec actress
- Charles Trudeau (politician) (1743–1816), 5th mayor of New Orleans, Louisiana, U.S.
- Colette Trudeau (born 1985), Canadian-born Métis singer and songwriter
- Dennis Trudeau (1947 or 1948–2025), Canadian journalist
- Edward Livingston Trudeau (1848–1915), American physician
- Étienne Truteau (1641–1712), French pioneer and ancestor of the Trudeau family
- Garry Trudeau (born 1948), American cartoonist of Doonesbury
- Jack Trudeau (born 1962), former professional American football player
- Jeffrey Trudeau Jr., semi-professional micro stakes poker player with 10 Circuit rings
- John Trudeau (1927–2008), American musician
- Kevin Trudeau (born 1963), American author, convicted felon and infomercial salesman
- Marc Vincent Trudeau (born 1957), Auxiliary Bishop of Los Angeles
- Noah Andre Trudeau (born 1949), American historian
- Roger Trudeau (born 1976), American ice hockey player
- Sophie Trudeau (musician), Canadian post-rock musician
- Stephanie Trudeau (born 1986), Miss USA beauty queen from St. Ignatius, Montana
- William Trudeau (born 2002), Canadian ice hockey player
- Yasmin Trudeau (born 1983 or 1984), American lawyer and politician
- Yves Trudeau (artist) (1930–2017), Quebec sculptor
- Yves Trudeau (biker) (1946–2008), Quebec biker and criminal
- Zénon Trudeau (1748–1813), Commandant Governor of Illinois between 1793 and 1799

== See also ==
- The dictionary definition of Trudeau at Wiktionary
- Truteau (surname)
