= Joseph Trudeau =

Joseph Trudeau, or variants, may refer to:

- Joseph Trudeau (1848–1919), an elder member of the Canadian political family
  - Charles-Émile Trudeau (1887–1935), his son, born Joseph Charles-Émile Trudeau
  - Pierre Trudeau (1919–2000), his grandson, born Joseph Philippe Pierre Yves Elliott Trudeau
  - Justin Trudeau (born 1971), his great-grandson, sometimes mistakenly called "Joe Trudeau"
- Joe Trudeau, a member of the South Dakota Sports Hall of Fame since 2016
