= Kokanee =

Kokanee is a word from the Okanagan language referring to land-locked lake populations of sockeye salmon (Oncorhynchus nerka). It may also refer to:

- Kokanee Range, a subrange of the Selkirk Mountains in British Columbia, Canada
- Kokanee salmon, a landlocked type of sockeye salmon
- Kokanee Creek Provincial Park, British Columbia, Canada
  - Kokanee, British Columbia, a settlement on the West Arm of Kootenay Lake in British Columbia, Canada, at the mouth of the creek
  - Kokanee Landing, a former steamboat landing and CPR station on the West Arm of Kootenay Lake in British Columbia, Canada
  - Kokanee Point is located on the north shore of the West Arm of Kootenay Lake, to the west of Kokanee (settlement)
  - Kokanee Narrows, a narrows on the West Arm of Kootenay Lake
- Kokanee Glacier Provincial Park, British Columbia, Canada, and associated placenames, including:
  - Kokanee Glacier
  - Kokanee Lake
  - Kokanee Pass, a mountain pass located in Kokanee Glacier Park
  - Kokanee Peak, a peak in the Kokanee Range located in Kokanee Glacier Park
- Kokanee beer, a popular beer in British Columbia, named for the Kokanee Glacier
- Kokanee Bay, a bay on the north side of Lac La Hache in the Cariboo region of British Columbia
- Kokanee Elementary School, a school in the Northshore School District, located in Bothell, King Country, Washington, United States
- Kokanee Campground, a locality in Fresno County, California
- Kokanee Picnic Area, a locality in Trinity County, California
- Kokanee Cove, a bay in Grand County, Colorado
- Kokanee Bend Fishing Access, a locality near Columbia Falls in Flathead County, Montana
- Lake Kokanee, a reservoir in Mason County, Washington
