= Trudeau (disambiguation) =

Trudeau is a surname that is used primarily in the Canadian province of Quebec.

Trudeau may also refer to:

- Trudeau family, Canadian political family, including premiers Pierre and Justin
- Montréal–Pierre Elliott Trudeau International Airport, in Montreal
- Trudeau Landing, an archaeological site in Louisiana
- Mount Pierre Elliott Trudeau, a mountain in British Columbia
- Trudeau Sanitorium, former New York tuberculosis sanitorium
- Trudeau Institute, a biomedical institute in New York
- Pierre Elliott Trudeau Foundation, a Canadian charity
- Trudeau Corporation, a North American housewares and kitchenwares company
- Trudeau (film), a 2002 television miniseries on Pierre Trudeau

== See also ==
- Trudeaumania, the nickname given in early 1968 to the excitement generated by Pierre Trudeau
- Pierre Elliott Trudeau (disambiguation)
- Truteau (surname)
