= HMCS Kokanee =

River-class frigate of the Royal Canadian Navy

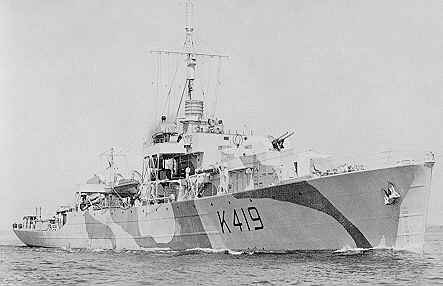
- HMCS Kokanee

History

Canada
- Name: Kokanee
- Namesake: Kokanee Lake
- Ordered: October 1941
- Builder: Yarrows Ltd., Esquimalt
- Laid down: 25 August 1943
- Launched: 27 November 1943
- Commissioned: 6 June 1944
- Decommissioned: 21 December 1945
- Identification: Pennant number: K419
- Honours and awards: Atlantic 1944–45, Gulf of St. Lawrence 1944
- Fate: Sold to India, 1948

India
- Name: Bengal
- Acquired: purchased 1948
- Fate: Scrapped 1965

General characteristics
- Class & type: River-class frigate
- Displacement: 1,445 tonnes (empty), 2,216 tonnes (full load)
- Length: 301.5 ft (91.9 m)
- Beam: 37 ft (11 m)
- Draught: 13 ft (4.0 m)
- Propulsion: 2 shafts, VTE, 2 boilers, 2 reciprocating main engines; 5,500 hp (4,100 kW)
- Speed: 19 knots (35 km/h)
- Range: 7,200 nautical miles (13,300 km)s at 12 knots (22 km/h)
- Endurance: 21.725 days
- Complement: 141
- Sensors & processing systems: Type 271 or SU type radar
- Electronic warfare & decoys: HF/DF (High Frequency Direction Finder)
- Armament: 1 x QF 4 in (102 mm) guns (later dual); 1 x QF 12 pdr (3 in (76 mm)) gun; 4 x 20 mm guns; 1 Hedgehog ASW mortar; 4 Mk.IV depth charge throwers; 150–200 depth charges

HMCS Kokanee was a River-class frigate that served in the Royal Canadian Navy during the Second World War. She saw action primarily in the Battle of the Atlantic as a convoy escort. After the war she was sold to India and converted into a pilot vessel.

Kokanee was ordered in October 1941 as part of the 1942–43 building program. Named after Kokanee Lake in southeastern British Columbia, she was laid down on 25 August 1943 at Yarrows Ltd., Esquimalt and launched on 27 November 1943. She was commissioned into the RCN with pennant number K419 on 6 June 1944 at the Esquimalt naval base. She departed for the Atlantic coast, arriving at HMC Dockyard in Halifax, Nova Scotia on 24 July 1944 and was tasked to Bermuda in August 1944 to work up her new crew.

== Background ==
The River-class frigate was designed by William Reed of Smith's Dock Company of South Bank-on-Tees. Originally called a "twin-screw corvette", its purpose was to improve on the convoy escort classes in service with the Royal Navy at the time, including the Flower-class corvette. The first orders were placed by the Royal Navy in 1940 and the vessels were named for rivers in the United Kingdom, giving name to the class. In Canada they were named for towns and cities though they kept the same designation. The name "frigate" was suggested by Vice-Admiral Percy Nelles of the Royal Canadian Navy and was adopted later that year.

Improvements over the corvette design included improved accommodation which was markedly better. The twin engines gave only three more knots of speed but extended the range of the ship to nearly double that of a corvette at 7,200 nautical miles (13,300 km) at 12 knots. Among other lessons applied to the design was an armament package better designed to combat U-boats including a twin 4-inch mount forward and 12-pounder aft. 15 Canadian frigates were initially fitted with a single 4-inch gun forward but with the exception of HMCS Valleyfield, they were all eventually upgraded to the double mount. For underwater targets, the River-class frigate was equipped with a Hedgehog anti-submarine mortar and depth charge rails aft and four side-mounted throwers.

River-class frigates were the first Royal Canadian Navy warships to carry the 147B Sword horizontal fan echo sonar transmitter in addition to the irregular ASDIC. This allowed the ship to maintain contact with targets even while firing unless a target was struck. Improved radar and direction-finding equipment improved the RCN's ability to find and track enemy submarines over the previous classes.

Canada originally ordered the construction of 33 frigates in October 1941. The design was too big for the shipyards on the Great Lakes so all the frigates built in Canada were built in dockyards along the west coast or along the St. Lawrence River. In all Canada ordered the construction of 60 frigates including ten for the Royal Navy that transferred two to the United States Navy.

== Service history ==
Upon finishing her training, Kokanee joined the RCN's Atlantic Fleet and returned to northern waters, arriving in St. John's in September where she was assigned to Escort Group C-3 as the Senior Officer's Ship. Kokanee and EG C-3 spent the remainder of the Battle of the Atlantic on convoy escort duty. She also earned battle honours in the Battle of the St. Lawrence between September–November 1944 when she escorted convoys from Quebec City to the Cabot Strait and Strait of Belle Isle. Kokanee spent the winter of 1944–1945 on the North Atlantic, escorting her final convoy ON.304 west from Derry, Northern Ireland on 25 May 1945.

She departed Halifax for Esquimalt in June 1945 and commenced refit there for tropicalization as part of Operation Downfall, the planned invasion of Japan. The Surrender of Japan took place in August while Kokanee was still in refit, which she completed on 4 October 1945. The peacetime downsizing of the RCN saw her paid off on 21 December 1945 and was placed in reserve status.

=== Civilian service ===
Kokanee was sold to the Calcutta Port Commission in 1949. She was converted to a 1,547 GRT pilot vessel for the Hooghly River and renamed Bengal. The ship was renamed P.V. Bengal in 1956 and was broken up in India in 1965.

== Images ==
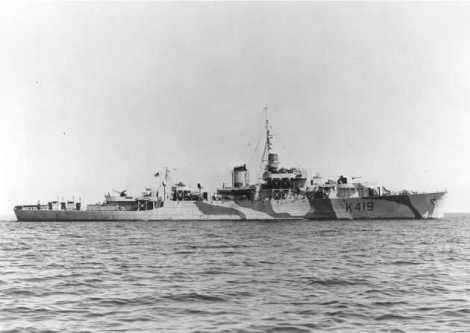
HMCS Kokanee
