= Alexandre Trudeau =

Canadian filmmaker and journalist (born 1973)

- Born: Alexandre Emmanuel Trudeau; December 25, 1973 (age 52); Ottawa Hospital, Ottawa, Ontario, Canada
- Other name: Sacha
- Education: McGill University
- Occupations: Filmmaker, journalist, author
- Spouse: Zoë Bedos
- Children: 3
- Parent(s): Pierre Trudeau (father); Margaret Trudeau (mother)
- Family: Trudeau

Alexandre Emmanuel Trudeau (born December 25, 1973) is a Canadian filmmaker, journalist and author of Barbarian Lost. He is the second son of Canada's former prime minister, Pierre Trudeau, and Margaret Trudeau, and the younger brother of Canada's former prime minister, Justin Trudeau.

== Early life and education ==
Alexandre Trudeau is the second son of Pierre Trudeau and Margaret Trudeau, exactly two years younger than older brother Justin.

The Trudeau family was attending the 1973 Christmas midnight mass at Mount Carmel Roman Catholic Church when Margaret Trudeau went into labour and was rushed to The Ottawa Hospital. His mother struggled with severe postpartum depression after his birth, and was later diagnosed with bipolar disorder. He was given the nickname "Sacha" (the French spelling of the Russian diminutive for Alexander) in recognition of his father's love of Russian literature and culture; the name also is linked to former ambassador of the USSR to Canada and Trudeau family friend Alexander Yakovlev. Alexandre Trudeau's younger brother, Michel, was born in 1975.

In an interview in 1977, Margaret Trudeau spoke about her sons: "Justin, 6, is a prince – a very good little boy. Sacha, born Christmas Day, 1973, is a bit of a revolutionary, very determined and strong willed. Miche (Michel) is a happy, well-adjusted child, who combined the best traits of both brothers."

Pierre Trudeau and Margaret Trudeau announced they would separate in 1977. His mother, unbeknownst to the public, then lived in an attic suite within the Prime Minister's official residence at 24 Sussex Drive in Ottawa for the next three years, to make the adjustment easier on the children. The divorce was finalized on April 2, 1984. On April 18, 1984, the three Trudeau brothers attended the civil marriage ceremony between Margaret Trudeau and Ottawa real estate developer Fried Kemper. The brothers have a half-brother, Kyle Kemper (born 1984), and a half-sister, Alicia Kemper (born 1988).

Following Pierre Trudeau's retirement from politics, Pierre and Margaret Trudeau raised the children in Montreal.

Trudeau's half-sister, Sarah Coyne was born in 1991 to Pierre Trudeau and Canadian politician Deborah Coyne.

Trudeau studied at Collège Jean-de-Brébeuf, like his father and brothers. He graduated with a Bachelor of Arts in philosophy and a Masters in Architecture from McGill University.

While attending McGill, he joined the Canadian Forces as a Reserve Entry Scheme Officer with Royal Canadian Hussars reserve regiment in 1996. He trained at CFB Gagetown, New Brunswick and was commissioned as a Second Lieutenant, but released voluntarily before completing his training as an armoured officer.

Following graduation, he traveled to West Africa to produce his first documentary: Liberia, the Secret War (1998). In the same year in which the documentary was made, his brother Michel died in an avalanche at Kokanee Glacier Provincial Park.

When Pierre Trudeau died in 2000, both his surviving sons returned to the public eye. Trudeau's heightened public profile brought new attention to his work as a journalist. After Pierre Trudeau's death, Alexandre continued to live in Cormier House, his father's Art Deco home in Montreal.

== Work ==
In the years following his father's death, Trudeau produced documentaries for Canadian television. In 2003, he was one of several Canadian journalists covering the 2003 invasion of Iraq, producing a documentary film for the CTV program W5, Embedded In Baghdad. His 2004 film, The Fence, shot in Afula, Israel and Jenin of the Palestinian territories focuses on families on either side of the Israeli-built security barrier around the West Bank.

In June 2005, Trudeau focused on what he said were the implications for civil liberties in the Canadian government's use of security certificates to detain suspected terrorists based on secret evidence indefinitely and without trial. Trudeau offered to be a surety for Hassan Almrei, a Syrian refugee held in a Canadian jail for four years without any charges being laid. This resulted in front-page coverage in the Toronto Star and National Post and major media attention being given to the security certificate issue for the first time. Trudeau's efforts were chronicled in his documentary Secure Freedom. Almrei was ordered released under house arrest by a Federal Court judge on January 2, 2009. On December 14, 2009, Almrei was released.

Trudeau attracted controversy in August 2006 for an article praising Fidel Castro's Cuba.

Trudeau's documentary Refuge, produced in 2008, tells the story of the humanitarian crisis facing Africa's Darfur region and eastern Chad. In 2012, he produced the film The New Great Game, for the Canadian Broadcasting Corporation about the maritime geopolitics of the Middle-East and Western Indian Ocean.

In 2016, Trudeau published his first book with HarperCollins, Barbarian Lost: Travels in the New China, which became a number one Canadian best-seller. The book is a travel mémoire and includes philosophical and historical reflection on societal change in China. About the book, Trudeau said: "My whole professional career has had a focus on geopolitics, and in this age, you cannot understand the world without understanding the massive role that China has grown to play."

In 2018, Trudeau presented his first scripted work, the short film Wiisgaapte (Bitter Smoke). The film is a collaboration with Dr. Shirley Williams, an Ojibwe language specialist. The film’s dialogue is entirely in old Ojibwe dialect and tells the story of the windigo legend of Algonquian lore.

In 2025, he released his narrative feature debut, Hair of the Bear, a thriller film co-directed with James McLellan.

== Public life ==
Alexandre Trudeau is President and Chief Producer at Same Adventure Productions, an independent production company. He and wife Zoë Bedos have three children: son, Pierre-Emmanuel, and daughters, Gala Simone and Ariane Lea. He is a founding member of the Pierre Elliott Trudeau Foundation for excellence in social sciences and humanities research and innovation.
