= Pierre Elliott Trudeau (disambiguation) =

Pierre Elliott Trudeau (1919–2000) was the fifteenth Prime Minister of Canada.

Pierre Elliott Trudeau may also refer to:

== Places ==
- Montréal–Pierre Elliott Trudeau International Airport in Montreal, Canada
- Mount Pierre Elliott Trudeau in the Cariboo region of British Columbia, Canada
- Pierre Elliott Trudeau School (disambiguation)

== Other uses ==
- Pierre Elliott Trudeau Foundation, a Canadian charity

== See also ==
- Trudeaumania, the idol worship phenomenon relating to the 15th PM of Canada.
- Trudeau family, the Canadian political family of Pierre Elliott Trudeau
- Trudeau, biographical 2002 television miniseries on Pierre Elliott Trudeau
- Trudeau (disambiguation)
- Elliott (disambiguation)
- Pierre (disambiguation)
