= Sophie Trudeau =

Sophie Trudeau could refer to:

- Sophie Grégoire Trudeau (born 1975), Canadian television host and wife of Canadian prime minister Justin Trudeau
- Sophie Trudeau (musician), Canadian violinist and member of Godspeed You! Black Emperor
