= Charles Trudeau =

Charles Trudeau may refer to:

- Charles-Émile Trudeau (1887–1935), Canadian businessman and father of Canadian Prime Minister Pierre Trudeau and grandfather of Canadian Prime Minister Justin Trudeau
- Charles Trudeau (politician) (1743–1816), mayor of New Orleans, Louisiana, USA
