= Kokanee Range =

Mountain range in British Columbia, Canada

Coordinates: 49°50′00″N 117°00′00″W

The Kokanee Range is a subrange of the Selkirk Mountains in the West Kootenay region of southeastern British Columbia, Canada. It is located between the valley of the Slocan River (W) and that of Kootenay Lake (E), and to the north of the Kootenay River and the West Arm of Kootenay Lake. The range includes Kokanee Glacier Provincial Park, Kokanee Peak, and Grays Peak, notable as the mountain featured on the label of Kokanee beer. The name "Kokanee" refers to a land-locked variety of Sockeye salmon.
