= Pierre Elliott Trudeau School =

Pierre Elliott Trudeau School may refer to the following schools in Canada:

== British Columbia ==
- Pierre Elliott Trudeau Elementary School, Vancouver: an elementary/primary school in the jurisdiction of the Vancouver School Board

== Manitoba ==
- Collège Pierre-Elliott-Trudeau, Winnipeg: a senior high school / secondary school

== Ontario ==
- École élémentaire Pierre-Elliott-Trudeau, Toronto: an elementary/primary school in the jurisdiction of the Conseil scolaire Viamonde
- Pierre Elliott Trudeau French Immersion Public School, St. Thomas: a school in the jurisdiction of the Thames Valley District School Board

== Quebec ==
- Pierre Elliott Trudeau Public School, Rosemère: an elementary/primary school in the jurisdiction of the Sir Wilfrid Laurier School Board
- Pierre Elliott Trudeau Public School, Gatineau: an elementary/primary school in the jurisdiction of the Western Québec School Board
- Pierre Elliott Trudeau Elementary School, Vaudreuil-Dorion: an elementaryschool in the jurisdiction of the Lester B. Pearson School Board

== See also ==
- Pierre Elliott Trudeau (disambiguation)
- Trudeau (disambiguation)
