= Grays Peak (British Columbia) =

Mountain in British Columbia, Canada

- Location within British Columbia

Highest point
- Elevation: 2,753 m (9,032 ft)
- Prominence: 223 m (732 ft)
- Coordinates: 49°43′36″N 117°07′28″W

Geography
- Location: British Columbia, Canada
- District: Kootenay Land District
- Parent range: Kokanee Range
- Topo map: NTS 82F11 Kokanee Peak

Grays Peak is a mountain in southeast British Columbia, Canada. It is located in Kokanee Glacier Provincial Park in the Kootenays, between the headwaters of Kokanee Creek and Coffee Creek. It is known for being the mountain pictured on the label of Kokanee beer.

== Name ==
Grays Peak was named after brothers John Balfour Gray and Robert Hampton Gray (VC), who were born in Trail, BC, and grew up in Nelson, BC. Both brothers were killed in WWII. The name was adopted by the Geographic Board of Canada on 12 March 1946.
