= Prime Minister Trudeau =

Prime Minister Trudeau may refer to:

- Pierre Trudeau (1919–2000), 15th prime minister of Canada (1968–1979, 1980–1984)
- Justin Trudeau (born 1971), 23rd prime minister of Canada (2015–2025) and son of the 15th prime minister

== See also ==
- Trudeau (surname)
