= Truteau =

Truteau is a surname from France.

People with this name include:

- Étienne Truteau (1642–1712), early settler to Longueuil, District of Montreal, Colony of Canada, New France, North America; what is now Longueuil, Quebec, Canada; founder of the Truteau and Trudeau family lineages of North America, including the Canadian political Trudeau family.
- Élisabeth Truteau (18th c.), mother of Superior General of the Congregation of Notre Dame Marie-Victoire Baudry (1782–1846)
- Flavia Truteau (19th c.), mother of Canadian feminist Caroline Dessaulles-Béique (1852–1946)
- Jean-Baptiste Truteau (1748–1827; also Jean Trudeau), an explorer of the Missouri Company, founding outposts on the Missouri, the Nebraska, and the Niobrara rivers.
- Robert Truteau (1544–1589), earliest known ancestor of the North American Trudeau/Truteau familial lineage, including Étienne Truteau and the Canadian political Trudeau family

== See also ==
- Trudeau (surname)
