= The Movie Out Here =

- Directed by: David Hicks
- Starring: Robin Nielsen; Viv Leacock; James Wallis
- Production company: Alliance Films
- Distributed by: eOne
- Release dates: November 30, 2012 (Whistler International Film Festival); March 1, 2013 (theatrical)
- Running time: 90 minutes
- Country: Canada

The Movie Out Here is a 2012 Canadian buddy comedy film. Premiering at the 2012 Whistler Film Festival, it began a limited run at theatres in Western Canada on March 1, 2013. The film was produced by Alliance Films and funded by Kokanee, a British Columbia-based brewery owned by the Labatt Brewing Company. The concept for the film was conceived by the staff of Grip Limited, an advertising agency who had worked on various campaigns for Kokanee in the past, and served as the first foray into branded content for both Grip and Labatt. Alongside traditional product placement, the film features appearances by popular characters from Kokanee's past advertising campaigns, and was the culmination of a multi-platform marketing campaign that was intended to encourage user engagement and crowdsourcing to help promote the film.

Reception to The Movie Out Here was largely negative, with critics panning its over-reliance on product placement, lewd content, and gross-out humour. Kokanee considered the film and campaign to be successful, having increased its market share by 6%.

== Plot ==
Adam (Robin Neilsen), a lawyer from Toronto, returns to his hometown of Fernie, British Columbia and discovers that a ski waxing business run by his friend Theo (James Wallis) is under threat by a real estate developer, prompting them to hold a party as a fundraiser.

== Production ==
The advertising agency Grip has been involved in several major campaigns for Kokanee. In recent years, the agency had put a focus on campaigns incorporating user engagement, regional pride, and social media: in its 2008 campaign "Live or Die", users voted to have Kokanee's popular Ranger mascot killed off in an upcoming advertisement. The campaign was followed up in 2011 by a campaign featuring the Ranger's ghost encouraging users to vote via Facebook in an election to determine the new Kokanee Ranger. After Labatt requested a "big" idea for their next campaign, Grip's creative director Randy Stein suggested that they produce a film, taking advantage of the continuing narrative portrayed by Kokanee's past advertising campaigns. Stein had expressed curiosity surrounding the concept of branded content—a form of entertainment content produced in collaboration with an advertiser. He believed that the film's target audience had become more accepting of branded entertainment, but still did not want to have advertising "shoved down their throats."

Kokanee and Alliance Films officially announced The Movie Out Here in May 2012; its title alluding to Kokanee's long-time slogan "The Beer Out Here". The Movie Out Here was produced in an unconventional manner in contrast to most feature films; the film had already received financing and promotion from Labatt before its screenplay was even completed. Aside from executive producer Jeff Sackman, the film was written, produced, and directed by Grip staff members. The film was described as a lewd, "feel-good" comedy about a group of friends who had reunited in the city of Fernie and want to "kind of go back to their roots." The film was also designed to pay tribute to life in Western Canada, including its landscape, communities, and its bars.

The release of The Movie Out Here came at a period of financial struggle for Canada's beer industry: a National Hockey League lockout that shortened the 2012-13 season reduced sales of beer in Canada by 12% overall, requiring the company to use new strategies to promote its products. The film was targeted towards males in their mid-20s, a key market for beer that has also struggled due to increasing competition from distilled beverages. Alongside traditional product placement, The Movie Out Here also incorporates popular characters from Kokanee's past advertising campaigns, such as the Ranger, the Glacier Girls, and the Sasquatch. Kokanee's brand manager Amy Rawlinson explained that the film should not be considered a "90-minute beer commercial", and was conceived from the start to be a "stand-alone" film. Rawlinson was more concerned about the emotional aspects of Kokanee's presence in the film rather than the number of times it appears.

== Distribution ==
=== Promotion ===
Expanding on the social media campaigns that Grip had created for the brewery in the past, a multi-platform advertising campaign was built around the production and release of The Movie Out Here, with a particular emphasis on the use of engagement marketing. Elements of crowdsourcing were used as part of the film's marketing strategy: through Kokanee's website, users could upload and vote on video auditions for 5 minor roles in the film, vote on the music to be incorporated into its soundtrack, submit props, and register to be one of 3,500 people that would be listed as a "fan" in its credits. Twenty bars in Western Canada also competed to become a filming location for The Movie Out Here; voting required users to enter a code off a specially-marked coaster obtained when ordering a Kokanee, thus encouraging further sales. Some bars also used tablets on-site to encourage customers to vote immediately after their order.

=== Release ===
The Movie Out Here premiered at the Whistler Film Festival on November 30, 2012. The film began a limited release at theatres in Canada's western provinces (such as British Columbia, Alberta, and Saskatchewan) on March 1, 2013.

== Reception ==
The Movie Out Here was critically panned for its poor storyline, reliance on gross-out humour, and its excessive product placement. John Lekich of The Georgia Straight described the film as an "abomination" consisting of "90 minutes of product placement slapped onto a foul-mouthed comedy so inherently worthless it’s almost enough to make me hate beer. Not just Kokanee. Any beer." Katherine Monk of Postmedia News gave The Movie Out Here a 1.5 out of 5; sharing similar criticisms, Monk described the film as being a product of a "Toronto boardroom" with a cliché plot, and doubted whether its writers were even trying to make it a "real" movie. She concluded that The Movie Out Here was not "[a] celebration of British Columbia's culture", but a film which "pimps it out for sudsy profits using boobies, fart jokes and sexist references to slutty girlfriends and casual intercourse."

Randy Stein believed that the response to The Movie Out Here by critics did not matter, and his staff even predicted that "hardcore film reviewers" would either "go in wanting to hate this film", or not even review it at all. He went on to report that the film had received a positive response from its target audience via social media. Among the theatres that screened the film in Vancouver, The Movie Out Here was the #4 film on its opening weekend. Kokanee's promotional efforts also had a positive impact on its beer sales; by the end of the nine-month campaign supporting the film, Kokanee had experienced a 6% increase in market share.

== See also ==
- Secrets of the Mountain and The Jensen Project, television films produced by and featuring product placement by Procter & Gamble and Walmart
