= Branded content =

Entertainment product funded by an advertiser

Branded content (also known as branded entertainment) is a type of entertainment product made or otherwise funded by an advertiser. They are designed to build awareness for a particular brand by presenting content that reflects its values and image, without necessarily being presented as a promotion first and foremost. Branded content is distinguished from product placement—a business practice in which advertisers pay to have references to their brands incorporated into a work (although branded content may still otherwise contain product placement), and content marketing—the use of content to specifically promote a product, service, or company.

Unlike conventional forms of editorial content, branded content is generally funded entirely by a brand or corporation rather than a studio or a group of solely artistic producers. Branded content has taken the form of television programming, films, internet video and other digital content, video games, events, and other installations. Modern branded marketing strategies are intended primarily to counter market trends, such as the decreasing acceptance of commercials and advertorials.

== History ==
=== Early examples ===
The concept of branded content dates back to the early era of broadcasting; many early radio and television programs were controlled by their sponsors and branded with their names, including the Colgate Comedy Hour, Hallmark Hall of Fame, and Westinghouse Studio One. Typically, the sponsor coordinated the entire production of the program, with the broadcaster only providing studios and airtime. These programs featured advertising segments for the sponsor's products, typically featuring the brand's spokesperson and demonstrations of new products. Notable spokespeople often became celebrities in their own right, such as Betty Furness, a B-movie actress whose fame was elevated after becoming a spokesperson for Westinghouse appliances on Studio One (Furness would later work as a consumer affairs reporter for WNBC-TV in New York City).

Many melodramatic serial dramas targeting women, such as As the World Turns, were produced by the consumer goods company Procter & Gamble; this prompted the genre as a whole to be dubbed a "soap opera". The Revlon cosmetics company gained significant prominence after sponsoring the quiz show The $64,000 Question—which was, for a time, the most-watched program on U.S. television. In 1956, the Ford Motor Company's new marque Edsel sponsored a CBS variety special, The Edsel Show, which starred Bing Crosby, Frank Sinatra, and Bob Hope. The special was a critical success and widely viewed, but its success did not transfer to Edsel itself, which was a high-profile commercial failure. By request of Crosby, the special was credited as a production of his alma mater Gonzaga University, with its revenues helping to fund the construction of a new campus library.

In the late 1950s, the quiz show scandals exposed that several major television game shows had been manipulated, or outright rigged under demand of their sponsors, in order to maintain viewer interest and ratings. Dotto and Twenty One were at the center of the scandal, with both shows having been accused of presenting staged matches with pre-determined outcomes as if they were genuine. Testimony by a producer of The $64,000 Question revealed that Revlon founder Charles Revson had personally exerted control over the program in order to favor specific contestants, but did not go as far as to rig the show. The aftermath of the scandals, as well as increasing production costs due to factors such as the rollout of color television, prompted networks to begin asserting creative control over the production and scheduling of their programming. Broadcasters also phased out of the "single sponsor" model, in favor of having sponsors purchase blocks of time during breaks in a program to run commercials instead.

Conventional product placement and cross-promotion still appeared in films and television, but it was often argued that overuse of placements can distract from the entertainment value of the work. The film Mac and Me was widely criticized for containing extensive placements of Coca-Cola and McDonald's as major plot elements (going as far as crediting the chain's mascot Ronald McDonald as appearing in the film "as himself"). Hallmark Hall of Fame still occasionally aired on broadcast TV until 2014, when it was announced that the franchise would move to Hallmark's co-owned cable channel Hallmark Channel in the future.

=== Modern examples ===
After releasing its hockey-themed film The Mighty Ducks, Disney established a National Hockey League expansion team known as the Mighty Ducks of Anaheim, which was named in reference to the film. Disney subsequently produced two Mighty Ducks film sequels, and an animated series inspired by the team set and in a fictional version of Anaheim. The films and cartoon series also featured cameos by Mighty Ducks players. These works were designed to increase awareness of the Mighty Ducks as a brand, and create synergies with Disney's core entertainment businesses. The NHL felt that the Mighty Ducks cartoon could help to promote the game of hockey among a younger audience, and counter the stereotype of hockey being associated with Canada and the U.S. Northeast. The team's merchandise, which was sold at Disney Parks and Disney Store locations in addition to the NHL's main retail channels, was the best-selling among all teams for a period.

In 2001, automaker BMW began a marketing campaign entitled The Hire, in which it produced a series of short films that prominently featured its vehicles, staffed by prominent directors (such as Guy Ritchie) and talent. The films were advertised through television, print, and online marketing which directed viewers to a BMW Films website, where they could stream the films, and access ancillary information such as information about their featured vehicles. BMW also distributed the films on DVD with Vanity Fair magazine to increase their distribution among the company's target audience. By the end of the campaign in 2005, the eight-film series had amassed over 100 million views, and several of the films had received both advertising-related and short film awards.

In 2010, Procter & Gamble and Walmart began to fund a series of made for TV films, distributed through the former's Procter & Gamble Productions division, such as The Jensen Project and Secrets of the Mountain. They were all targeted towards family viewing, aired primarily on NBC as time-buys, and featured product placement for P&G brands and Walmart's store brand Great Value. In turn, Walmart erected promotional displays of P&G products related to each film, and sold the films on DVD immediately after their broadcast. Both companies used exclusive advertising time during the films to promote their products. P&G reported that the favorability of the products featured in Secrets of the Mountain increased by 26% among mothers who saw the film. Advertising Age felt that despite lukewarm reception and viewership, "as case studies for successful branded entertainment, they've become the holy grail of how networks and marketers can use entertainment to achieve scalable audiences, measurable product sales and active fan communities."

The Canadian beer brand Kokanee (owned by Anheuser-Busch InBev) partnered with its agency Grip and Alliance Films to produce The Movie Out Here, a feature-length comedy film set in the brand's home province of British Columbia. The film was released in April 2013, after being featured at the 2012 Whistler Film Festival. Kokanee beer, along with characters from its past advertising campaigns, make appearances in the film, and an accompanying campaign allowed bars in Western Canada to compete to be a filming location, and users to vote on the film's soundtrack and have a chance to be listed as a "fan" in the credits. Grip's creative director Randy Stein stated that viewers had become more accepting of branded content, and that there would be a larger focus on the emotional aspects of Kokanee as a brand as opposed to the number of placements. In 2018, Pepsi similarly backed the comedy film Uncle Drew—a feature comedy adapted from a character from a Pepsi Max ad campaign.

The energy drink company Red Bull has relied heavily on branded content as part of its marketing strategies. The company operates several Media House studios, which coordinate the production and distribution of original content targeted towards the interests of young adults—particularly music and extreme sports. Alongside digital media content such as online video (via platforms such as Red Bull TV), and print media such as The Red Bulletin, Red Bull has also organized events and sports competitions which carry its name, such as the Red Bull Air Race World Championship, Crashed Ice, and Flugtag competitions, music festivals and events, and a skydive from the Earth's stratosphere by Felix Baumgartner. These ventures are consistent with the company's image, bolster Red Bull as being a lifestyle brand in these categories, and build awareness of Red Bull without necessarily promoting the product itself. An executive for Red Bull Media House North America remarked that the growth of digital media platforms had made it easier for brands to produce and distribute their own content, and stressed that branded content was most effective when it is "authentic" and high-quality.

In 2019, the housing rentals service Airbnb premiered a self-produced documentary—Gay Chorus Deep South—at the Tribeca Film Festival, which documented a 2017 tour of the Southeastern United States by the San Francisco Gay Men's Chorus. The company's head of creative James Goode stated that the film was consistent with the company's values of "telling stories of belonging and acceptance", and its involvement and support in the LGBT community. Goode did not consider the film to be branded content, stating that it was an effort to "support the chorus and make the highest-quality piece of content we could."

In 2021, British department store Marks & Spencer (M&S) co-funded the reality cooking competition series Cooking with the Stars for ITV; the series features product placement of M&S, while accompanying digital content and in-store cross-promotions highlight the M&S products featured in each episode.

Some branded content efforts have not been as successful. The association football (soccer) sanctioning body FIFA budgeted the 2014 film United Passions, a dramatization of the organization's history. The film was released to negative reviews, focusing primarily on its poor writing and self-serving nature, and with many considering it one of the worst films of all time. The film's North American release also coincided with the indictment of FIFA officials by U.S. federal prosecutors under charges of corruption, leading critics to point out the irony in its depiction of then-FIFA president Sepp Blatter. The film only took in $918 in the U.S. box office, making it the worst-grossing film of all-time.

== Research and issues ==
In 2003, the Branded Content Marketing Association was formed in order to promote branded content to a wider, international audience. In January 2008, the BCMA conducted a study intending to analyze the efficacy of branded content compared to traditional advertising. Reportedly, over one-third of people were skeptical about traditional ads, and only one-tenth trusted the companies producing such adverts. The study concluded that "in the overwhelming majority of cases consumers preferred the more innovative approach compared with traditional advertising". Over 95% of the time, web sites that feature branded content were more successful than web sites featuring typical advertisements, and are 24% more effective at increasing the purchase intent of viewers. Branded content is most effective in the 18-34 age group, who tend to react with more positive opinions and being overall more responsive to branded sites. Online Publishers Association’s President Pam Horan concluded, “In nearly every category measured, ad effectiveness scores on branded content sites were numerically higher than on the web in general, on portals or on ad networks.

These positive results, however, having come from an organization which endeavors to promote the marketing practice, are subject to criticisms of bias.

== Measurement ==
Because branded content blurs the line between editorial and advertising, brands typically gauge its effectiveness using methods adapted from advertising research rather than direct-response metrics such as clicks or conversions. The most common approach is the brand lift study, in which a randomly selected group of consumers exposed to the content is compared with an unexposed control group on survey-based metrics such as ad recall, brand awareness, favorability, and purchase intent. A 2016 Nielsen analysis of more than 100 pieces of branded video content reported that branded content generated an average of 86% brand recall among viewers, compared with 65% for the same brand promoted through pre-roll advertising, with comparable gains in brand affinity and purchase intent.

A related technique is the search lift study, which compares the volume of organic queries for a brand or product between exposed and control groups in order to attribute changes in search behavior to a campaign. To estimate sales lift, advertisers use causal inference techniques such as randomized geo experiments, in which entire geographic markets are randomly assigned to receive or be withheld from a campaign so that the resulting difference in sales can be attributed to the campaign rather than to underlying demand.

== Award community ==
Webby and Lovie awards among other had recognized Branded Content as a category in prior instances, but most awards within the advertising community officially began to grow to include branded content in 2012, when "Branded Content/Entertainment" became a category at EuroBest, Dubai Lynx Spikes Asia and Cannes Lions International Festival of Creativity.

== See also ==
- 5B
- As the Cookie Crumbles
- Experiential marketing
- Fat Actress
- Integrated marketing communications
- Native advertising
- No. 5 The Film
- No Logo
- Permission marketing
- Popeye
