= Columbia Brewery =

Brewery in Creston, British Columbia, Canada

- Founded: 1898 (as Steele Brewery)
- Headquarters: Creston, British Columbia, Canada
- Owner: AB InBev

The Columbia Brewery is a brewery that was a part of the Fort Steele Brewery, established in 1898 by Fritz Sick in Creston, British Columbia.

== Production ==
The brewery is known for Kokanee, a light Pilsner-style beer. In the past, Kokanee beers were canned near Vancouver, British Columbia. After undergoing a large expansion of around 44,000 square feet (4,100 m^{2}) in 2005, the Columbia Brewery now produces up to one million cans of beer a day.

== See also ==
- Kokanee beer
- Labatt Brewing Company
- InBev
