= Embedded In Baghdad =

- Written by: Alexandre Trudeau
- Directed by: Alexandre Trudeau
- Starring: Layla; Anmar As-Saadi
- Country of origin: Canada
- Original languages: English; French

Production
- Producer: Alexandre Trudeau
- Cinematography: Alexandre Trudeau; Dave Brunet
- Running time: 43 minutes

Original release
- Network: CTV Television Network
- Release: 2003

Embedded In Baghdad is a 2003 documentary created by Alexandre Trudeau for the CTV Television Program W-FIVE. It documents Trudeau's experience before, during, and after the US Bombing Campaign with the A-Saadi family, a middle-class family living in Baghdad.

== External links and references ==
- Sacha Trudeau remembers Iraq in documentary.
- jujufilms
