= As the Cookie Crumbles =

2008 Canadian web series

- As the Cookie Crumbles logo
- Country of origin: Canada
- Original language: English
- No. of seasons: 1
- No. of episodes: 8

Original release
- Release: September 18 – November 6, 2008

As the Cookie Crumbles is a web-based soap opera produced by Kraft Canada. Eight weekly episodes were broadcast from September 18, 2008, through November 6, 2008.

A promotional vehicle for Kraft's brand Peek Freans Lifestyle Selections, a line of cookies with alleged health benefits, the branded content series featured love, hate, mystery and heartbreak storylines centered on the Casa di Tea, an oceanside teahouse in fictional Glamora County. According to Peek Freans, the company looked at "consumers' love for soap operas" and gave As the Cookie Crumbles "all the stereotypical elements you'd expect to find in a soap opera." The series was distributed on a variety of platforms including DailyMotion, Revver, Blip, Funny or Die, and iTunes.
