= Xav =

Canadian R&B singer (born 2007)

- Born: Xavier James Trudeau; October 18, 2007 (age 19); Montreal, Quebec, Canada
- Occupations: Singer; songwriter
- Years active: 2025–present
- Parents: Justin Trudeau (father); Sophie Grégoire (mother)
- Relatives: Trudeau family
- Website: pathwaymusicgroup.com/xav

Xavier James Trudeau (born October 18, 2007), known professionally as Xav, is a Canadian R&B singer. He is the son of Justin Trudeau and grandson of Pierre Trudeau — both former Canadian prime ministers. Xav has released three singles and is signed to Ottawa-based record label Pathway Music Group.

== Early life ==
Xavier James Trudeau was born on October 18, 2007, in Montreal, Quebec, Canada, to future prime minister Justin Trudeau and Sophie Grégoire Trudeau. He is the eldest of three children; his siblings are Ella-Grace, born in 2009, and Hadrien, born in 2014. Trudeau is the sixth great-grandson of Major-General William Farquhar.

Raised in a bilingual household, Xav is fluent in both English and French. In 2015, following his father's election as prime minister, the family moved to Rideau Cottage in Ottawa, rather than the official residence at 24 Sussex Drive, which was deemed uninhabitable due to needed repairs.

He has occasionally accompanied his father on official visits, including the 2023 G20 summit in New Delhi, India. His public appearances have drawn attention for his confidence and bilingual communication skills.

== Career ==
Trudeau began his music career in early 2025, performing under the stage name Xav.

On February 21, 2025, Xav released his debut single, "Til The Nights Done", a moody R&B track produced by Vishal "Duava" Daluwatte and recorded by Boyer. The song features backing vocals from his sister, Ella-Grace Trudeau, and draws inspiration from artists like Drake and Don Toliver. A music video accompanied the release, premiering on Xav's YouTube channel the same day.

Following his debut, Xav released his second single, "Everything I Know," in March 2025. The track continued to showcase his R&B style and was accompanied by a music video that further established his presence in the music industry.

In May 2025, Xav released his third single, "Back Me Up," which garnered significant media attention. The music video features Xav dancing in a room adorned with newspaper clippings, interspersed with grainy footage of a moving car. The video's release was accompanied by a viral clip of Xav watching the video with his father, former prime minister Justin Trudeau. In the father-son interaction, the elder Trudeau playfully critiques his son's dance moves.

Music correspondent Eric Alper praised Xav's conscious distinction of himself from his father in the lyrics of "Til The Nights Done", adding that "if he can back up the intrigue with strong songwriting and consistent releases, he has a real shot at carving out his own space in the industry." Toronto Star journalist Richie Assaly felt that while he considered "Til The Nights Done" to be musically unremarkable, declining Canada–United States relations made the song culturally significant as "a reminder that the drab, ephemerality of Canadian culture can, in fact, be a bulwark against the dizzying extremism of American culture".

On August 15, 2026, Trudeau reached the Billboard Canada airplay charts for the first time with his song "Downtown".

== Personal life ==
Trudeau is in a relationship with TikTok influencer Pariya Carello.
