= Kokanee Lake =

Alpine lakes in British Columbia, Canada

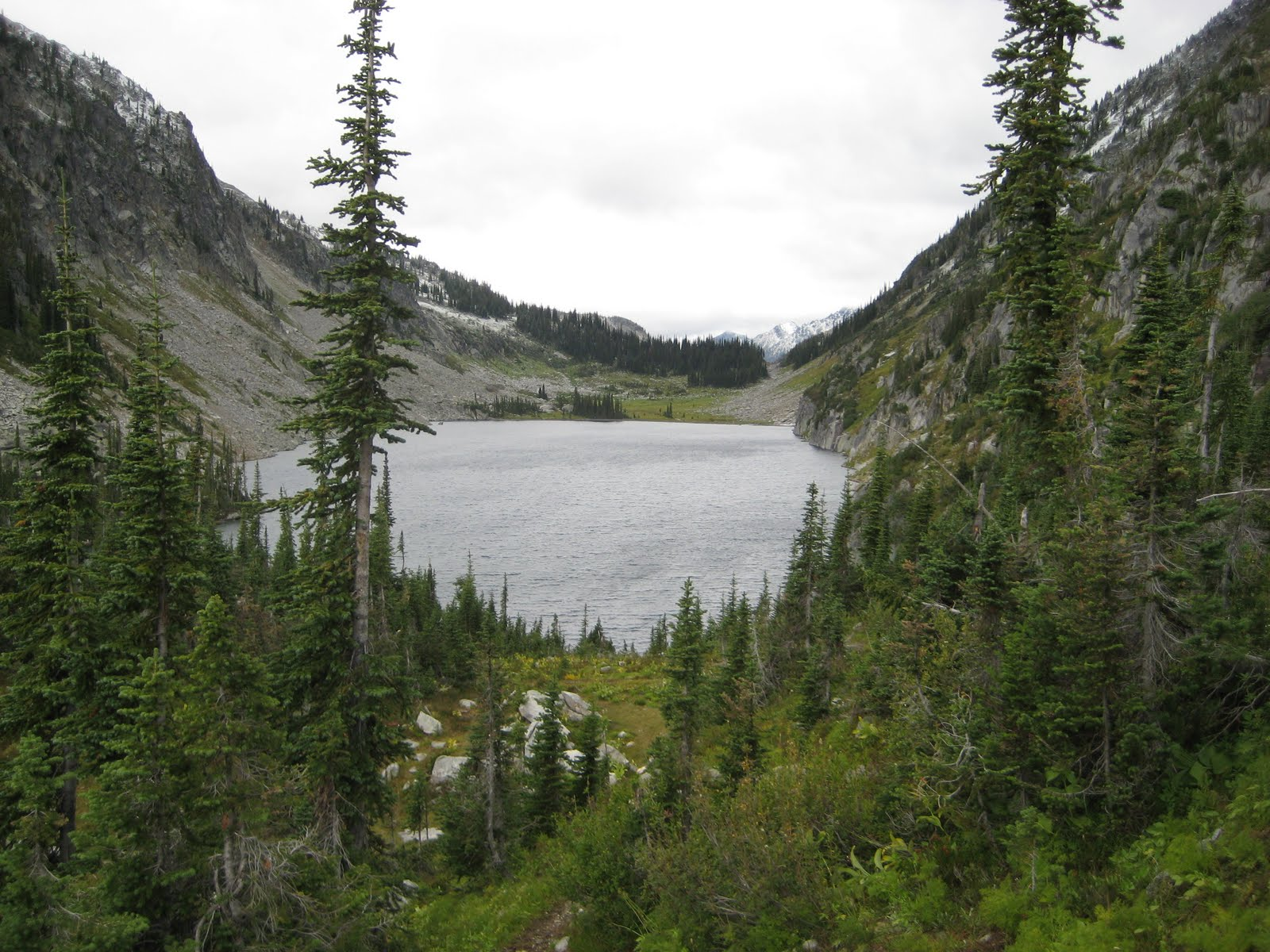
- Kokanee Lake

- Location within British Columbia
- Location: British Columbia
- Coordinates: 49.7481°N 117.1756°W
- Primary inflows: Kokanee Glacier
- Primary outflows: Kokanee Creek
- Basin countries: Canada
- Max. length: 1,200 m (3,900 ft)
- Max. width: 400 m (1,300 ft)
- Surface elevation: 1,981 m (6,499 ft)

Kokanee Lake is one of over 30 alpine lakes located in British Columbia's Kokanee Glacier Provincial Park. The lake is approximately 1,200 metres (3,900 ft) long and 400 metres (1,300 ft) wide, at an elevation of 1,981 metres (6,499 ft) and located at the head of Kokanee Creek. It is fed by the Kokanee Glacier and is the headwater of Kokanee Creek. Access is possible via the Gibson Lake trailhead, from which Kokanee Lake is a four-kilometre (2.5 mi) hike. Fishing is permitted and the lake is usually stocked with cutthroat trout.

== Michel Trudeau avalanche accident ==
On November 13, 1998, Michel Trudeau, youngest son of former Canadian Prime Minister Pierre Trudeau and younger brother of Canadian former Prime Minister Justin Trudeau, drowned following an avalanche that swept him into Kokanee Lake. Despite an extensive search his body was not recovered. The Kokanee Glacier Cabin was built on the shore of Kaslo Lake to commemorate him and 12 others who died as a result of avalanches in the park.

== See also ==
- List of lakes of British Columbia
- Kokanee (disambiguation)
