= Angus Trudeau =

First Nations artist from Ontario (1905-1984)

- Born: 1905; Wikwemikong Unceded Indian Reserve, Ontario, Canada Manitoulin Island, Ontario
- Died: 1984 (aged 78–79)
- Citizenship: Wiikwemkoong First Nation and Canada
- Education: self-taught

Angus Trudeau (1905 – 1984) was an Anishinaabe artist whose inspiration was drawn from the world of Manitoulin Island, Lake Huron, Ontario where he lived. His paintings and model ships combine memory and history, tradition, and modern art.

== Career ==
Angus Trudeau worked as a sailor and cook aboard Lake Huron commercial ships on Lake Huron but devoted his spare time and retirement years to painting and model-building. His subjects — the lake freighters, ferry boats, logging camps and communities these boats supplied — are often portrayed through memory or through reference materials he collected such as old postcards, photographs, and other printed materials. Trudeau's work records Anishinaabe modern art and Trudeau's part in mechanization.

The Isaacs Gallery in Toronto gave him solo shows in 1976, 1978, and 1980, and he participated in numerous group exhibitions. In 1986, Ian Thom for the McMichael Canadian Art Collection in Kleinburg curated the exhibition Angus Trudeau's Manitoulin which circulated across Canada. Trudeau's work is in the collections of the Art Gallery of Sudbury, the Beaverbrook Art Gallery in Fredericton, the McMichael Canadian Art Collection in Kleinburg, the Thunder Bay Art Gallery, the Art Gallery of Windsor, and Crown-Indigenous Relations and Northern Affairs Canada.

== Record Sale Prices ==
In 2026, at the June 11 sale of Post-War Canadian Folk Art at Miller & Miller Auction at New Hamburg, Ontario, Angus Trudeau's Norgama, a painting of a packet ship navigating Georgian Bay, sold for $11,000.
