= Étienne Truteau =

French colonist of New France (1641–1712)

- Born: June 8, 1641; La Rochelle, Kingdom of France
- Died: July 22, 1712 (aged 71); Longueuil, Quebec, New France
- Known for: Early Canadian pioneer
- Family: Trudeau

Étienne Truteau (1641–1712) was an early French pioneer who emigrated to New France, which later became Canada. He was involved with the colonization and development of the area of New France that is now Montreal, Longueuil and Saint-Lambert. He was a master carpenter, wheelwright, and notable soldier. He is the patronymic ancestor of the Trudeau family (Truteau) of North America including the American politician Charles Laveau Trudeau, Zénon Trudeau, cartoonist Garry Trudeau, and Canadian prime ministers Pierre Trudeau and Justin Trudeau.

== Early life ==
Étienne Truteau was born in La Rochelle, France, on June 8, 1641, to François Truteau, a master stonemason, and Catherine Matinier.

== Life ==
He emigrated to New France arriving on September 7, 1659. In 1663 he was hired as a master-carpenter by La Compagnie-des-Prêtres-de-Saint-Sulpice. He married Adrienne Barbier-dit-Le Minime in 1667, having 14 children. On March 12, 1675, he was granted land by Charles Le Moyne. His third son, François Trudeau (1673–1739) emigrated to French Louisiana.

He is best known for fighting as a militia man, in particular in the 1662 battle against the Iroquois during the colony's establishment. In 1663, he enlisted in the 6th Squadron of the Militia de-la-Sainte-Famille, headed by Governor Paul de-Chomedey-de-Maisonneuve.

He died in Montréal on July 22, 1712.

== Lineage ==
He is the patronymic ancestor of the Trudeau family (Truteau) in North America, including Canadian prime ministers Pierre Trudeau and Justin Trudeau, American politician Charles Trudeau, Charles Laveau Trudeau, Zénon Trudeau, and cartoonist Garry Trudeau.

His lineage can be traced back to Marcillac-Lanville in France in the 16th century, to a Robert Matthias Truteau (1544–1589).

== Legacy ==
In Québec a Longueuil Park bears his name, a street in Notre Dame de L'ile-de-Perrot is named after him and in Saint-Lambert an avenue bears his name.
