= Trudeau family =

French Canadian political family

Trudeau
- Political family
- Coat of arms granted to Pierre Trudeau by the Canadian Heraldic Authority
- Current region: Central Canada (Montreal and Ottawa)
- Earlier spellings: Truteau
- Origin: New France
- Founder: Charles-Émile Trudeau
- Titles: List: Prime Minister of Canada (15th & 23rd); Leader of the Opposition (Canada); Leader of the Liberal Party of Canada (7th & 14th); Minister of Justice and Attorney General of Canada; Minister of Intergovernmental Affairs and Youth; Member of Parliament (for Mount Royal & for Papineau)
- Connected families: Sinclair
- Distinctions: Trudeauism, Trudeaumania

The Trudeau family is a Canadian political family, originating from the French colonial period, in what is now Quebec. Two members of the family, Pierre Trudeau and Justin Trudeau, have served as the prime minister of Canada.

== Members ==
- Joseph Trudeau (1848–1919), Canadian farm owner
  - Charles-Émile Trudeau (1887–1935), Canadian businessman and father of Canadian Prime Minister Pierre Trudeau
    - Pierre Trudeau (1919–2000), 15th Prime Minister of Canada (1968–1979 and 1980–1984)
      - Margaret Trudeau (b. 1948), activist and divorced wife of Pierre Trudeau
      - Justin Trudeau (b. 1971), 23rd Prime Minister of Canada (2015–2025), son of Pierre and Margaret Trudeau
        - Sophie Grégoire Trudeau (b. 1975), former television host and separated wife of Justin Trudeau
        - Xavier Trudeau (b. 2007), singer and son of Justin and Sophie
        - Ella-Grace Margaret Trudeau (b. 2009), daughter of Justin and Sophie
        - Hadrien Grégoire (b. 2014), son of Justin and Sophie
      - Alexandre Trudeau (b. 1973), Canadian film-maker and son of Pierre and Margaret
      - Michel Trudeau (1975–1998), son of Pierre and Margaret and died in an avalanche
      - Sarah Elizabeth Coyne (b. 1991), daughter of Pierre Trudeau and Deborah Coyne

=== Connected people ===
- James Sinclair (1908–1984), maternal grandfather of Justin Trudeau and father of Margaret Trudeau
- William Farquhar (1774–1839), first British resident of Singapore and 5th great-grandfather of Justin Trudeau

Trudeau family tree

Malvina Cardinal (1849‑1931)	Joseph Trudeau (1848‑1919)
Grace Elliott (1890‑1973)	Charles-Émile Trudeau (1887‑1935)
Margaret Trudeau (b. 1948)	Pierre Trudeau (1919‑2000)	Deborah Coyne (b. 1955)
Sophie Grégoire Trudeau (b. 1975)	Justin Trudeau (b. 1971)	Alexandre Trudeau (b. 1973)	Zoë Bedos	Michel Trudeau (1975‑1998)	Sarah Elizabeth Coyne (b. 1991)
Xavier Trudeau (b. 2007)	Ella Grace Margaret Trudeau (b. 2009)	Hadrien Grégoire (b. 2014)

== Ancestry ==
The Trudeau family's surname can be traced back to Marcillac-Lanville in France, in the 16th century, and to a Robert Truteau (1544–1589). The lineage in North America was established by Étienne Truteau (1641–1712), in what is now Longueuil (of the Canadian province of Quebec), who arrived in Canada in 1659.

== Offices held ==
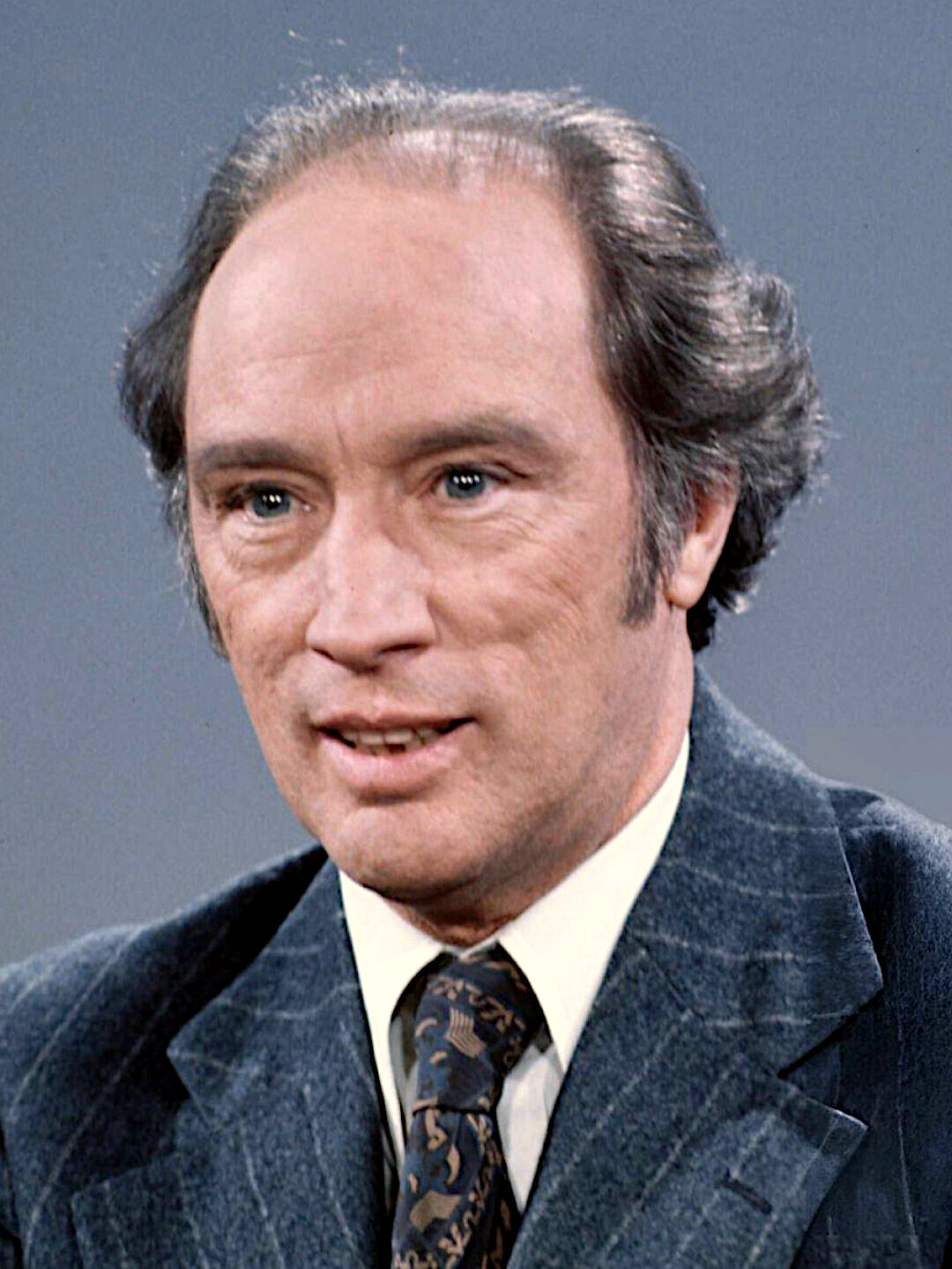
Pierre Trudeau served as prime minister twice between 1968 and 1984.

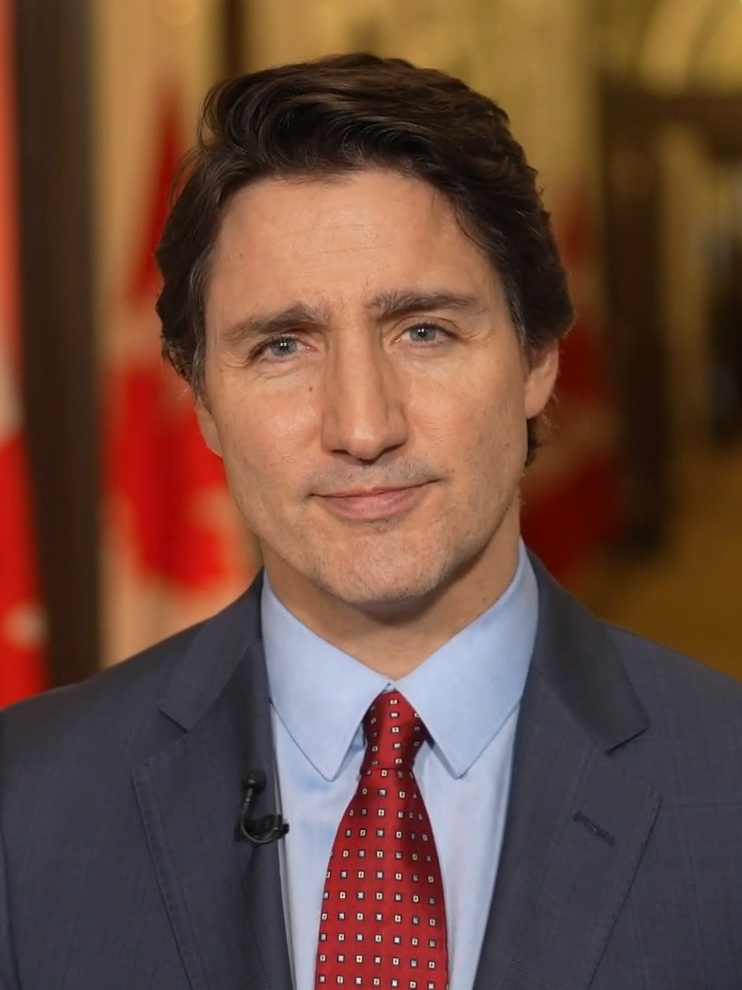
Justin Trudeau served as prime minister between 2015 and 2025.

- Prime Minister of Canada
  - April 20, 1968 – June 4, 1979
  - March 3, 1980 – June 30, 1984
  - November 4, 2015 – March 14, 2025
- Leader of the Liberal Party of Canada
  - April 6, 1968 – June 16, 1984
  - April 14, 2013 – March 9, 2025
- Minister of Justice and Attorney General of Canada
  - April 4, 1967 – July 5, 1968
- President of the Queen's Privy Council for Canada
  - March 11, 1968 – May 1, 1968
- Minister of Intergovernmental Affairs and Youth
  - November 4, 2015 – July 18, 2018
- Member of the Canadian Parliament
  - for Mount Royal
    - November 8, 1965 – September 4, 1984
  - for Papineau
    - October 14, 2008 – April 28, 2025

== See also ==
- Mulroney family
- Ford family (Canada)
- Lewis family
- Layton family

== Sources ==
- "Généalogie Martial Trudeau". Généalogie du Québec et de l'Acadie (in French). 2012. Archived from the original on September 4, 2013.
