= Margaret Trudeau =

Canadian activist, ex-wife of Pierre Trudeau

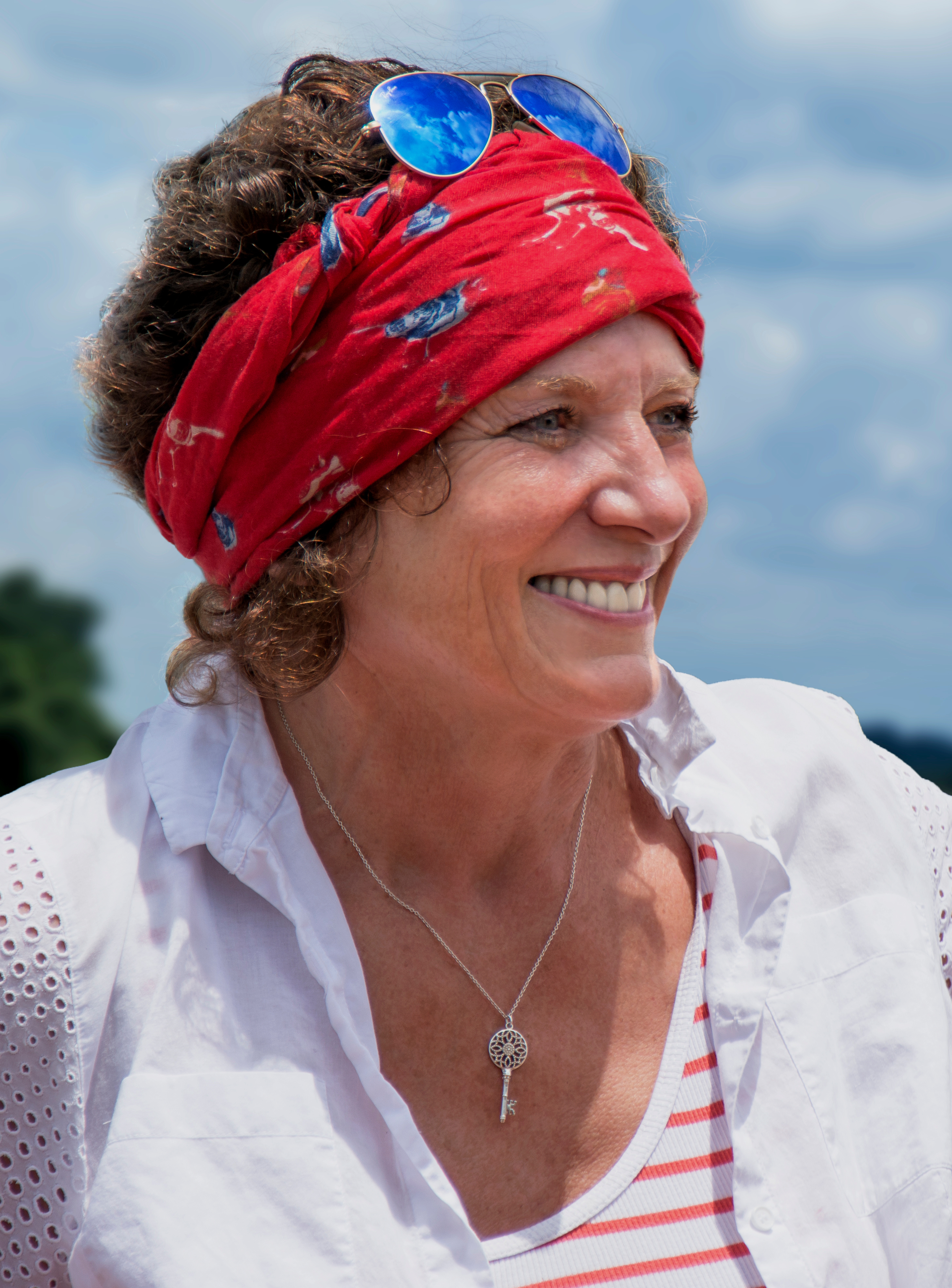
- Trudeau in 2014
- Born: Margaret Joan Sinclair; September 10, 1948 (age 78); West Vancouver, British Columbia, Canada
- Known for: Spouse of the Prime Minister of Canada
- Spouses: Pierre Trudeau (m. 1971; div. 1984) Fried Kemper (m. 1984; div. 1999)
- Children: 5, including Justin, Alexandre, and Michel
- Parent(s): James Sinclair; Kathleen Bernard

Margaret Joan Trudeau (née Sinclair; born September 10, 1948) is a Canadian activist and the mother of Justin Trudeau, the 23rd prime minister of Canada. She married Pierre Trudeau, the 15th prime minister of Canada, in 1971, three years after he became prime minister. They divorced in 1984, during his final months in office. She is also the mother of the journalist and author Alexandre "Sacha" Trudeau, and Michel Trudeau (now deceased) with Trudeau, and of son Kyle (born 1984), and daughter Alicia (born 1988), with Ottawa real-estate developer Fried Kemper. She is the first woman in Canadian history to have been both the wife and the mother of prime ministers. Trudeau is an advocate for people with bipolar disorder, with which she has been diagnosed.

== Early life ==
Trudeau was born in North Vancouver, British Columbia, Canada, the daughter of Scottish-born James "Jimmy" Sinclair, a former Liberal member of the Parliament of Canada and Minister of Fisheries and Oceans, and Doris Kathleen (née Bernard) Sinclair. Her grandmother, Rose Edith (née Ivens) Bernard, with whom she had an especially close relationship, lived in Roberts Creek, British Columbia, in later life, and was from Virden, Manitoba. Her grandfather, Thomas Kirkpatrick Bernard, was born in Makassar, Dutch Celebes, now in Sulawesi, Indonesia, and immigrated in 1906 at age 15 with his family to Penticton, British Columbia, eventually working as a payroll clerk for Canadian Pacific Railway.

The Bernards were the descendants of colonists in the Straits Settlements, the Dutch East Indies, and British Malaya, nowadays respectively Singapore, Indonesia, and Malaysia, including Francis James Bernard, a London, England-born Anglo-Irishman whose great-grandfather, Arthur Bernard, was a member of the Irish House of Commons for Bandonbridge, and brother of Francis Bernard, Solicitor-General for Ireland, and ancestor of the Earls of Bandon. Francis James Bernard was the founder of the Singapore Police Force in 1819, The Singapore Chronicle, the first newspaper in Singapore, was established with Bernard as owner, publisher, and editor in 1824 and he opened up Katong, now a densely populated-residential enclave, the first to cultivate a coconut estate there in 1823. In 1818, Bernard married Margaret Trudeau's 3rd great-grandmother, Esther Farquhar. She was the eldest daughter of Scotsman William Farquhar, a colonial leader in the founding of modern Singapore, by Farquhar's first wife, Antoinette "Nonio" Clement, who was the daughter of a French father and an ethnic Malaccan mother.

Another great-grandmother, Cornelia Louisa Intveld, married in 1822 to Royal Navy officer and merchant, William Purvis, from Dalgety Bay, Scotland, and a first cousin of American abolitionist Robert Purvis; she was a noted fine soprano and a beauty of her era. Upon glimpsing her across the auditorium at the opera in London, England, William IV sent his equerry to invite her to his box. After she refused, the King sent the equerry back just to ask her name. Intveld was born in Padang, present-day West Sumatra, Indonesia. At the time of Intveld's birth, Padang was in the territory of the Pagaruyung Kingdom, where her father, who came from humble beginnings in Hellevoetsluis, South Holland, rose up through the Dutch East India Company to become the Dutch Resident of Padang. Her maternal grandmother was an Ono Niha ranee (a term covering every rank from chieftain's daughter to princess) who married a prominent Dutch colonial official and merchant. Acclaimed British harpsichordist Violet Gordon-Woodhouse, and Hawaiian settler Edward William Purvis who, according to popular belief, was the namesake of the ukulele, are Margaret Trudeau's first cousins, three times removed. Trudeau explored her mother's family's roots in Singapore during an episode of Who Do You Think You Are?

Trudeau's family moved to a large house in Rockcliffe Park, Ontario, in 1952 after her father was appointed to the Cabinet, and she attended Rockcliffe Park Public School although they returned to North Vancouver after he lost his re-election bid in 1958. She attended Hamilton Junior Secondary School and Delbrook Senior Secondary School in North Vancouver. Trudeau graduated in 1969 from Simon Fraser University in Burnaby, British Columbia with a Bachelor of Arts in sociology.

== Marriage to Pierre Trudeau ==
Sinclair met Pierre Trudeau, who was then Minister of Justice, while vacationing in Tahiti with her family when she was 18. Sinclair did not recognize him, and she in fact thought little of their encounter, but Trudeau, then 47, was captivated by the carefree "flower child" and began to pursue her.

Pierre Trudeau was a bachelor before he became Prime Minister in 1968. They kept their romance private, so Canadians were shocked after the Canadian Broadcasting Corporation led its morning radio broadcast about Prime Minister Trudeau honeymooning at Alta Lake, British Columbia, at the foot of Whistler Blackcomb Ski Resort the day after a surprise wedding in North Vancouver, British Columbia, on March 4, 1971. Although she had accompanied Pierre Trudeau in public a year before to ice skate and dance at an event at Rideau Hall, official residence of Canada's Governor General, it was a complete secret except to immediate family members and close friends that she was in a romantic relationship, then in a six-month engagement to the Prime Minister.

As Pierre Trudeau was a Catholic, she converted to the Catholic Church for their marriage. When asked about her role in a marriage to the prime minister, Trudeau said, "I want to be more than a rose in my husband's lapel."

In 1971, the Trudeaus took a second honeymoon in the Caribbean to Barbados and an unidentified nearby island then Tobago, then to Saint Vincent and the Grenadines (including both Bequia and St. Vincent) with Pierre taking a side-trip to Trinidad while Margaret stayed in Tobago.

After Pierre Trudeau's government's near defeat in 1972 (Margaret herself was uninvolved in the campaign), she decided to become much more active for the 1974 federal election. At a rally in Vancouver, she told a crowd of 2,000 her husband taught her "a lot about loving." The remark was wildly mocked and dismissed in public during the campaign by members of the press gallery as well as by her husband's main political rivals Progressive Conservative Party of Canada leader Robert Stanfield and New Democratic Party leader David Lewis.

Liberal party organizers considered her a top campaign asset, and sent her off alone to help local candidates in hotly contested ridings while, as critics noted, the wives of Stanfield and Lewis were on the campaign trail but rarely spoke and stood behind their husbands at events. Political observers also found Pierre Trudeau noticeably more relaxed at events while Margaret came along. Initially, she brought her six-month-old son Sacha on the trail with her, and one veteran reporter said, "It's the first campaign plane for the first thing off is a crib and a diaper bag." Later, she left her sons with her parents in North Vancouver while campaigning. Asked at the time if she thought her campaigning was helping Pierre Trudeau pick up votes, she replied, "I won't know until July 8th. But 52 per cent of the voters in this country are women...an awful lot ..." Her husband's party returned to a majority-government.

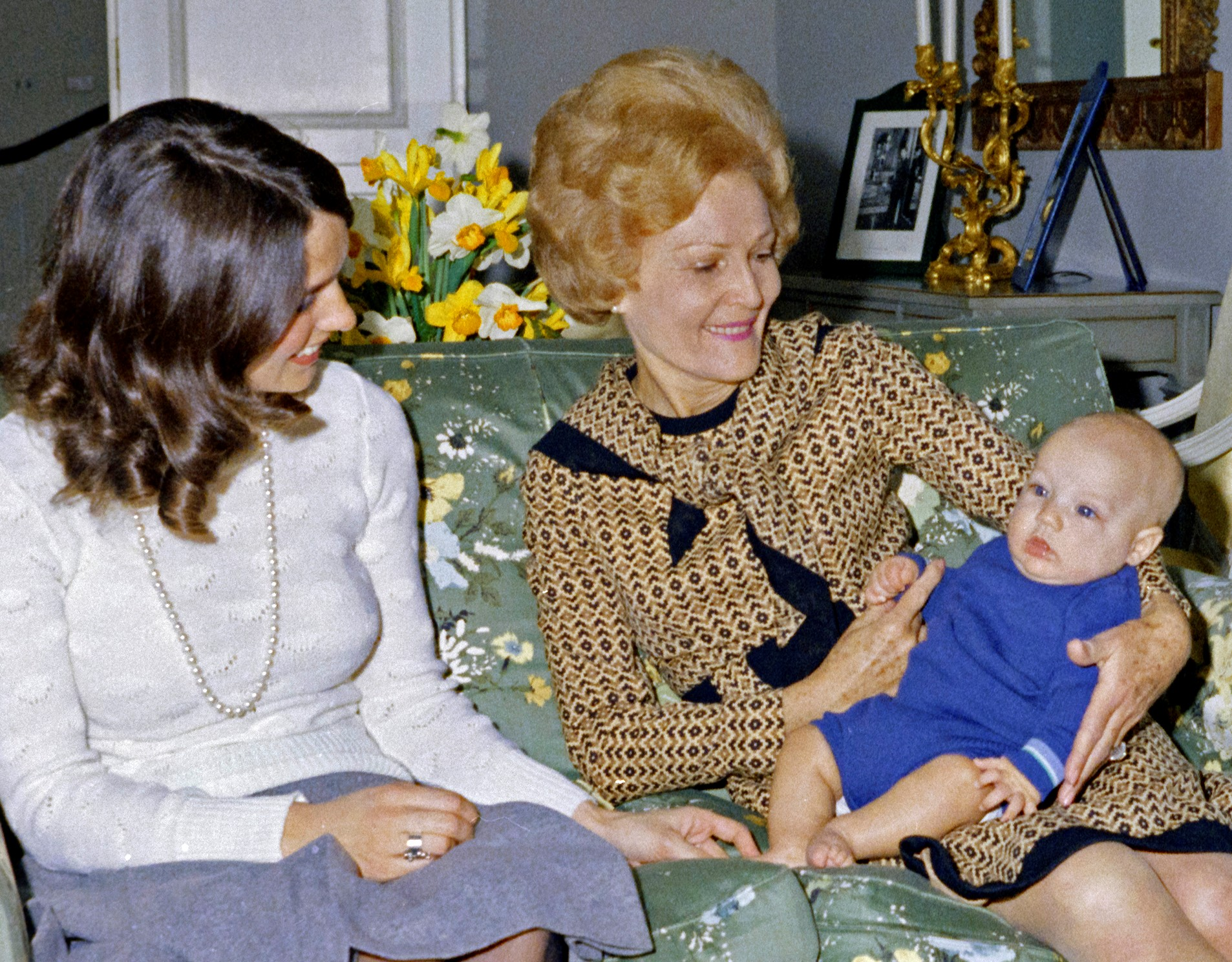
Margaret Trudeau with Pat Nixon holding Justin Trudeau at Rideau Hall in Ottawa on April 14, 1972.

"From the day I became Mrs. Pierre Elliott Trudeau," she writes in her memoirs, "a glass panel was gently lowered into place around me, like a patient in a mental hospital no longer considered able to make decisions and cannot be exposed to a harsh light." The couple had three children: Justin (born December 25, 1971), Alexandre (Sacha) (born December 25, 1973), and Michel (October 2, 1975 – November 13, 1998).

Trudeau tore apart a quilt made by Canadian conceptual artist Joyce Wieland on the wall in the prime-minister's official residence in Ottawa because it celebrated "reason over passion". (Her husband's personal motto was "Reason before passion".)

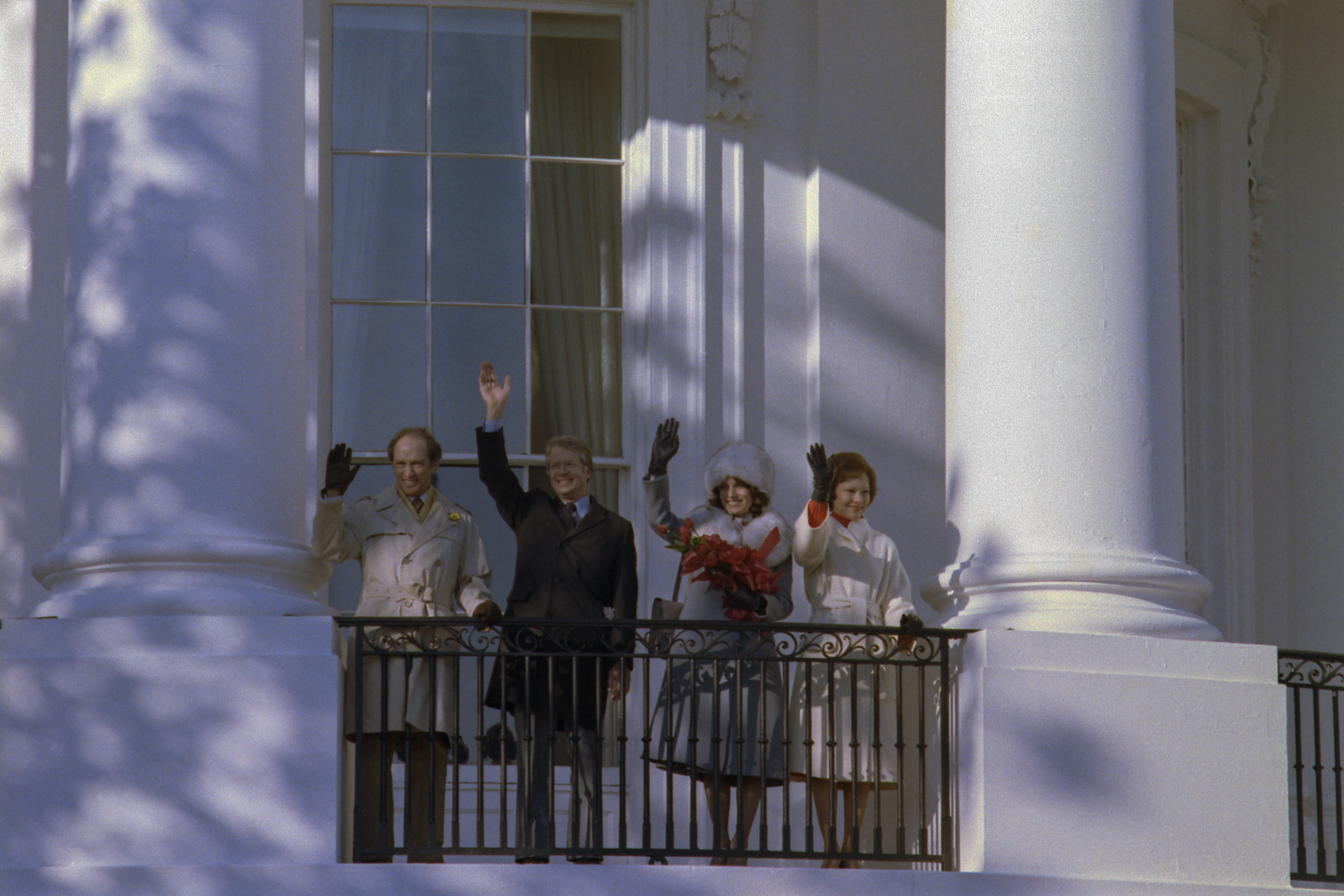
Pierre Trudeau, Jimmy Carter, Margaret Trudeau and Rosalynn Carter at a state visit arrival ceremony at the White House on February 21, 1977.

Over time, the marriage disintegrated to the point where, as recounted in her 1982 book Consequences, Trudeau had affairs with Jack Nicholson, Ryan O'Neal, Lou Rawls, and US Senator Ted Kennedy. She was also associated with members of the Rolling Stones, including Ronnie Wood and, according to Keith Richards' autobiography, Life, Mick Jagger.

She separated from her husband in 1977. Pierre Trudeau won custody of the children and did not pay spousal support. Margaret Trudeau had a difficult time earning a living after her marriage. She wrote the 1979 book Beyond Reason about her marriage.

On the eve of the 1979 election, in which Pierre Trudeau's party lost the majority of seats in the House of Commons, she was dancing at Studio 54 nightclub in New York City. A photo of her at the disco was featured on many front pages across Canada.

== Divorce and second marriage ==
Margaret Trudeau filed for a no-fault divorce at the Ontario Supreme Court on November 16, 1983, which was finalized on April 2, 1984. On April 18, 1984, with her three sons attending, she married Ottawa real-estate developer Fried Kemper in a civil ceremony in the chambers of Judge Hugh Poulin. She had two children with him: son Kyle (born 1984), and daughter Alicia (born 1988), before divorcing in 1999.

== Later life ==
In November 1998, the Trudeaus' youngest son, Michel, an avid outdoorsman, was killed when an avalanche swept him to the bottom of British Columbia's Kokanee Lake. The loss of her son was devastating.

When Pierre Trudeau died in 2000, Margaret was at his bedside with their surviving sons Justin and Alexandre. Speaking in 2010 about her marriage to Trudeau, she said: "Just because our marriage ended didn't mean the love stopped."

On October 19, 2015, her eldest son, Justin Trudeau, led the Liberal Party to a majority government, becoming the 23rd Prime Minister of Canada. During the campaign, she was involved, but avoided campaigning in public as the Conservative campaign's main attack line against Justin was "Just Not Ready" and she feared they would suggest her son was "so unready he needs his mummy."

On April 27, 2020, Trudeau was hospitalized with smoke inhalation after a fire broke out in her apartment building.

== Work, advocacy and writing ==
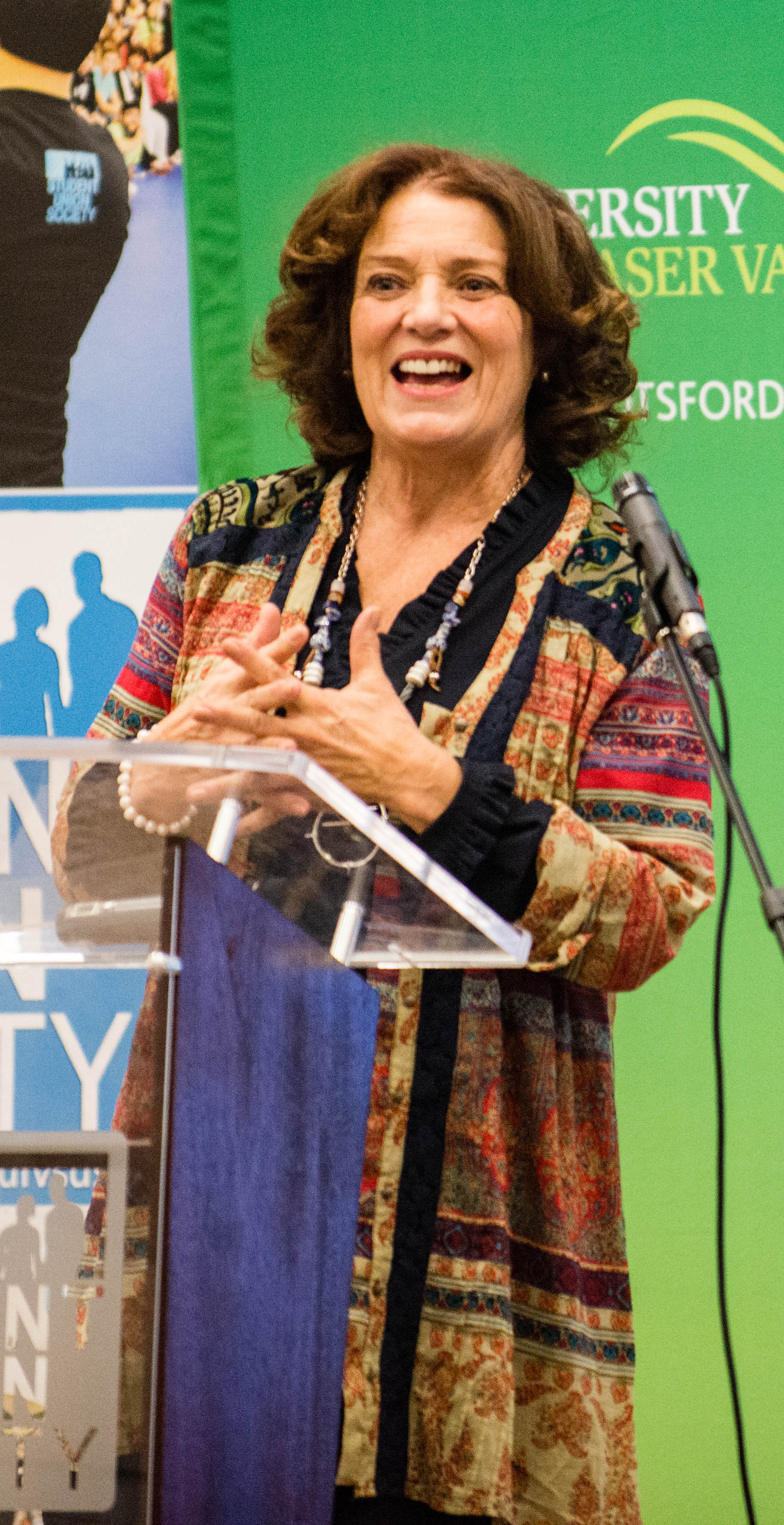
Trudeau speaks at the University of the Fraser Valley in 2017.

From 2002 to 2017, Trudeau was the honorary president of WaterAid Canada, an Ottawa-based organization dedicated to helping the poorest communities in developing countries build sustainable water supply and sanitation services. In 2014, she visited Mali as an ambassador of WaterAid Canada.

On May 5, 2006, Trudeau announced she has bipolar disorder. Since then, she advocated for reducing the social-stigma of mental illness—bipolar disorder in particular—with speaking engagements across North America. In May 2019, she presented the one-woman-show Certain Woman of an Age in Chicago as part of the city's Wellness Week. She is an honorary patron of the Canadian Mental Health Association. In July 2019, she attended an opening ceremony of WE College in Narok County (Kenya) with former Prime Minister of Canada Kim Campbell, Kenyan First Lady Margaret Kenyatta and Craig Kielburger, a co-founder of WE Charity organization.

In 2010, she authored Changing My Mind, a book about her personal experience with bipolar disorder.

== Award ==
In 2013, Trudeau received an honorary degree of Doctor of Laws from the University of Western Ontario in recognition of her work to combat mental illness.

== Bibliography ==
- Trudeau, Margaret (1979). Beyond Reason. Grosset & Dunlap. ISBN 0-448-23037-2.
- — (1982). Consequences. Bantam. ISBN 0-553-01712-8.
- — (2010). Changing My Mind. HarperCollins. ISBN 978-1-55468-538-7.
- — (2015). The Time of Your Life: Choosing a Vibrant, Joyful Future. HarperCollins. ISBN 978-1-443-43183-5.

== Filmography ==
While still married to Pierre Trudeau, Margaret Trudeau had a brief acting career, appearing in two Canadian-produced films:

- The Guardian Angel, 1978
- Kings and Desperate Men, 1981

== Television ==
- Morning Magazine (1981–1983)
- Margaret (1983–1984)

== See also ==
- Spouse of the prime minister of Canada
