= Sophie Grégoire Trudeau =

Canadian TV presenter (born 1975)

Sophie Grégoire
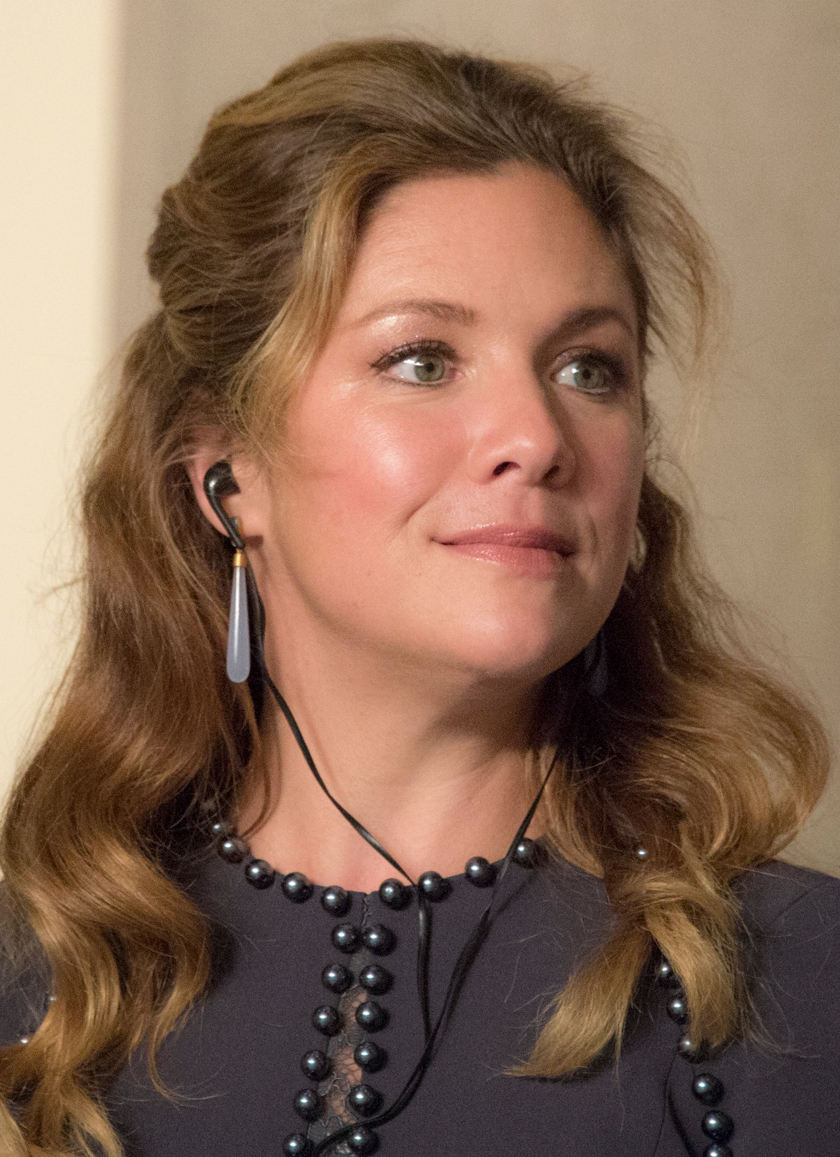
- Grégoire in 2017
- Born: Sophie Grégoire; April 24, 1975 (age 51); Montreal, Quebec, Canada
- Education: Université de Montréal
- Occupation: Media personality
- Spouse: Justin Trudeau (m. 2005; sep. 2023)
- Children: 3, including Xavier
- Website: sophiegregoiretrudeau.com

Sophie Grégoire (French pronunciation: [sɔfi ɡʁeɡwɑʁ]; born April 24, 1975) (Note: Quebec law does not permit a married woman to take her husband's surname.) is a Canadian public speaker and retired television host. She married Justin Trudeau, the 23rd prime minister of Canada, in 2005; the couple separated in 2023. She is involved in charity work, social work, and public speaking focused mainly on the environment, women's issues, and children's issues.

== Early life and education ==
Grégoire was born on April 24, 1975, in Montreal, Quebec, as the only child of Jean Grégoire, a stockbroker, and Estelle Blais, a Franco-Ontarian nurse. Her family lived north of the city, in Sainte-Adèle, eventually relocating to Montreal when she was four years old. She was raised thereafter in Montreal's Mount Royal suburb, where she was a classmate and childhood friend of Michel Trudeau, the youngest son of Prime Minister Pierre Trudeau and his wife Margaret and brother of Grégoire's future husband, Justin Trudeau.

Grégoire has stated that her "childhood was a happy one", noting that she was a good student who made friends easily and loved sports and the outdoors. Beginning around the age of 17, she struggled with bulimia nervosa. The problem lasted into her early 20s, when she revealed the illness to her parents and then began a two-year period of recovery. She credits therapy, the support of her loved ones, and yoga with her recovery from the illness.

Grégoire attended high school at the private Pensionnat du Saint-Nom-de-Marie in Outremont. She subsequently attended the Collège Jean-de-Brébeuf before studying commerce at McGill University, intending to follow her father's career path, but soon switched to communications studies, and ultimately graduated with a Bachelor of Arts degree in communications from the Université de Montréal.

== Career ==
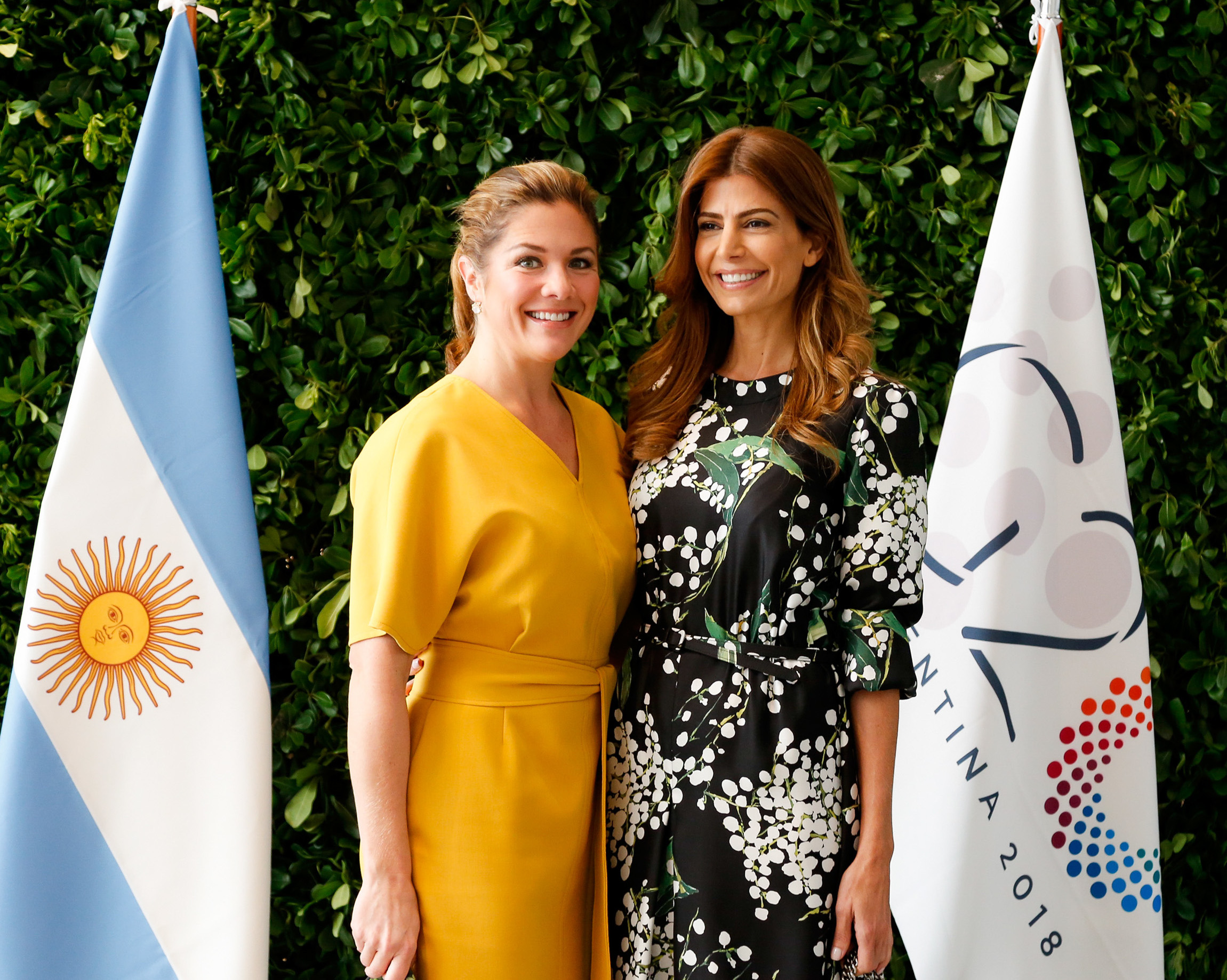
Grégoire (left) with Juliana Awada, First Lady of Argentina in Buenos Aires, November 2018

Grégoire's first job was as a receptionist and assistant at an advertising firm. She was promoted to an account manager, but after three years of working in advertising, public relations, and sales, she decided to attend radio and television school, where she immediately knew, "I had found my calling". After completing her studies there, Grégoire got a job in a newsroom, writing the news ticker. A lover of culture, arts, and films, when she became aware of an opening at Quebec television station LCN for an entertainment reporter, she applied and was successful in obtaining the position. In addition to serving as an entertainment reporter for LCN's daily Showbiz segment, she contributed to segments on Salut, Bonjour!, Clin d'œil, and Bec et Museau for TVA, and hosted Canal Évasion's Escales de Rêves and Canal Z's Teksho. Grégoire also served as co-host on CKMF-FM Radio's morning shows and contributed to Radio-Canada's Coup de Pouce. Additionally, she worked in the mid-2000s as a personal shopper for upscale department store Holt Renfrew.

Grégoire became a certified yoga instructor in 2012. She also works as a professional public speaker, focusing primarily on women's issues.

=== eTalk ===
In 2005, Grégoire attended a charity function where she met several CTV Television Network employees. This led to her being hired in September 2005 as a reporter for eTalk, CTV's Canadian entertainment news show. She served until 2010 as eTalk's Quebec correspondent, and focused her reporting on the philanthropy and activism of celebrities.

=== Charity work ===
Grégoire is actively involved in charity work, volunteering for several Canadian charities and non-profit organizations. Causes she supports include Sheena's Place and BACA, both of which assist those suffering from eating disorders; La Maison Bleue, a drop-in centre for at-risk pregnant mothers; Dove's "Pay Beauty Forward" campaign and Self-Esteem Fund, Girls for the Cure; the Canadian Cancer Society; the Canadian Mental Health Association; the Women's Heart and Stroke Association; and WaterCan. As part of her work with WaterCan, Grégoire travelled to Ethiopia in October 2006 with her mother-in-law, Margaret Trudeau, who is the honorary president of the organization. Their trip was featured in a CTV documentary, "A Window Opens: Margaret and Sophie in Ethiopia", which aired in May 2007. Grégoire is the national ambassador for Plan Canada's "Because I am a Girl" initiative, and the official spokesperson for The Shield of Athena, which helps women and children dealing with domestic violence.

== Personal life ==
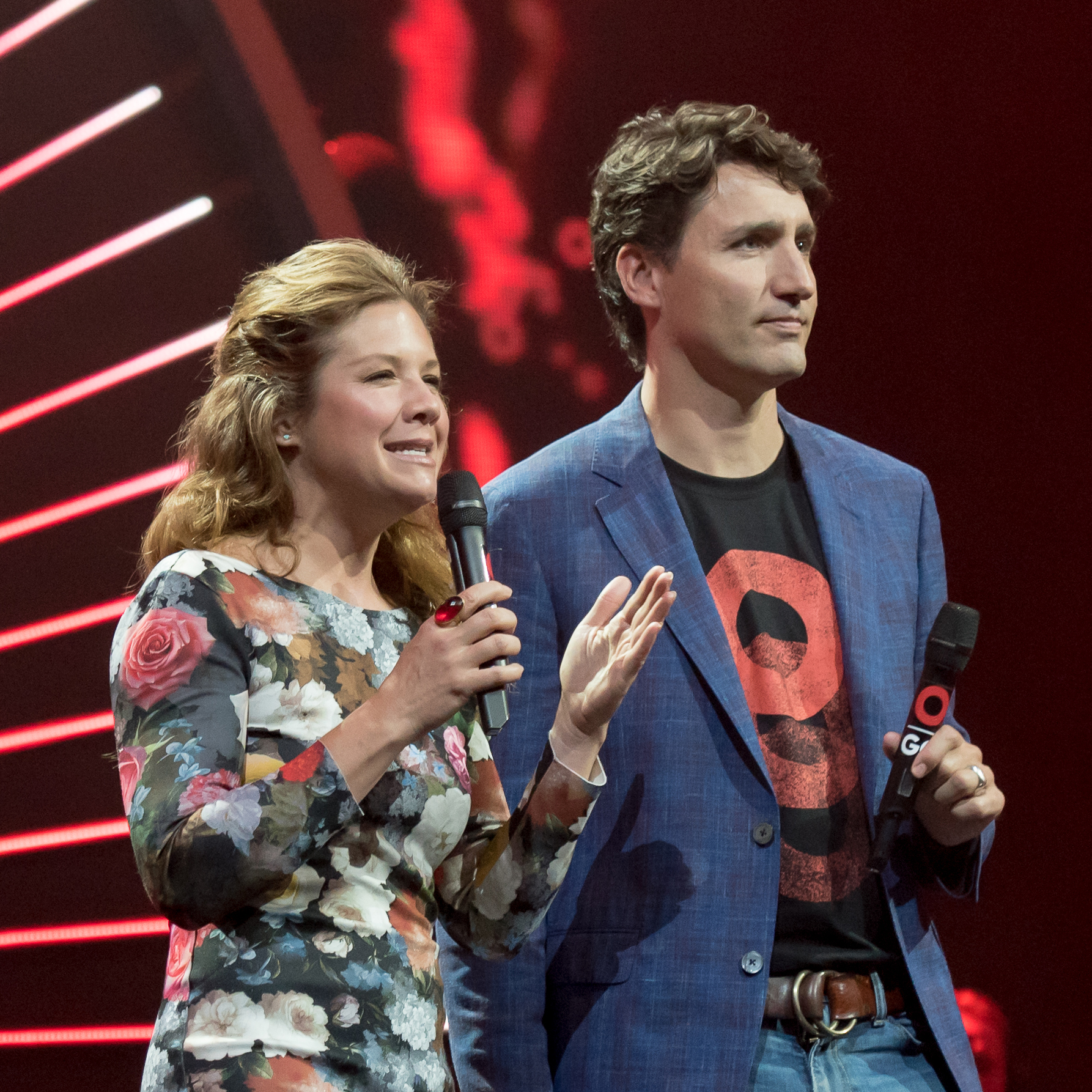
Sophie Trudeau and her husband in Hamburg, 2017

Grégoire first met Justin Trudeau, the eldest son of Prime Minister Pierre Trudeau, when they were both growing up in Montreal, where Grégoire was a classmate and childhood friend of the youngest Trudeau son, Michel. Grégoire and Trudeau reconnected as adults in June 2003, when they were assigned to co-host a charity ball, and began dating several months later. They became engaged in October 2004, and married on May 28, 2005, in a ceremony at Montreal's Sainte-Madeleine d'Outremont Church. They have three children: Xavier James, Ella-Grace Margaret, and Hadrien Grégoire.

External videos
- "Sophie Grégoire Trudeau is determined to move forward " – CBC News: The National. May 11, 2024 (9:56 mins)

After her husband became a Member of Parliament for Montreal's Papineau riding in 2008, Grégoire continued to live in their Montreal home with their children, while Trudeau stayed at a hotel in Ottawa during the week. In June 2013, two months after Trudeau became the leader of the Liberal Party of Canada, the couple sold their home in Montreal's Côte-des-Neiges neighbourhood and began living in a rented home in the Rockcliffe Park area of Ottawa.

Grégoire Trudeau's husband, Justin Trudeau, was officially sworn in as the Prime Minister of Canada on November 4, 2015. After the end of the 2015 election, Grégoire Trudeau indicated her preference for the hyphenated surname of "Grégoire-Trudeau", but she switched to using the unhyphenated form in March 2016.

Grégoire is fluent in French, English, and Spanish.

On March 12, 2020, Grégoire isolated herself at Rideau Cottage, along with her husband and children, after she showed flu-like symptoms during the COVID-19 pandemic, shortly after she returned from a speaking engagement in the United Kingdom. The Prime Minister's Office announced later that day that she had tested positive for COVID-19. By March 28, she had recovered.

On August 2, 2023, Trudeau and Grégoire's separation was announced.

=== "Smile Back at Me" ===
On January 18, 2016, Grégoire Trudeau made the impromptu decision to sing a work she composed, titled "Smile Back at Me", at the end of a speech in honour of Martin Luther King Jr. Day at Ottawa City Hall. Mike Strobel, of the Toronto Sun, said the crowd gave her a standing ovation. Toronto Star pop music critic Ben Rayner said the song was "out of pitch" and "cast serious doubt upon her musical judgment". In Maclean's, Michael Barclay (formerly a music critic), described the song as "fine", although not designed to be sung a capella, and that Grégoire's voice was "surprisingly strong". Remixed versions of the song were released online afterward. Several commenters felt the song was out of place at a memorial to a Black civil rights leader, and also noted the general lack of Black leaders being depicted or included in the event itself. Some commenters noted that she did have training previously in various musical arts.

== Publications ==
- Grégoire Trudeau, Sophie (2024). Closer Together: Knowing Ourselves, Loving Each Other. Random House of Canada. ISBN 978-1-0390-0744-4.
