= Kokanee Creek Provincial Park =

Provincial park in British Columbia, Canada

- IUCN category II (national park)
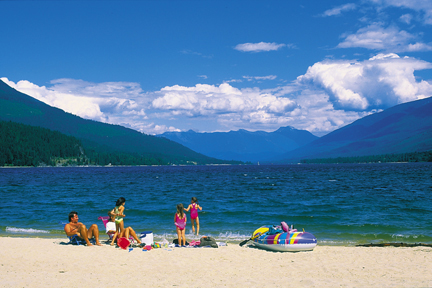

- Location within British Columbia
- Interactive map of Kokanee Creek Provincial Park
- Location: British Columbia, Canada
- Nearest city: Nelson, British Columbia
- Coordinates: 49°36′31″N 117°07′25″W
- Area: 260 ha (640 acres)
- Established: 1955
- Visitors: 326,785 (in 2017-18)
- Governing body: BC Parks
- Website: bcparks.ca/kokanee-creek-park/

Kokanee Creek Provincial Park is a provincial park on the west shore of Kootenay Lake in the West Kootenay region of southeastern British Columbia. Highway 3A bisects the park 19 kilometres (12 mi) east of Nelson.

Established as a BC Provincial Park in 1955, it encompasses 260 hectares of sandy beaches, deltas, and coniferous forest.

Kitto (or Kitto's, or Kittos) Landing was formerly at this location. Believed to be named after Henry Richard Kitto, who farmed the land from 1910, a government wharf existed by 1912. The Consolidated Mining and Smelting Co. hauled ore from its Molly Gibson mine to this landing. During the 1920s, the place fell into obscurity.

== See also ==
- Kokanee Glacier Provincial Park
- Kokanee (disambiguation)
