= Kokanee beer =

Canadian beer brand

Kokanee logo

Kokanee is a North American lager-style beer produced at the Columbia Brewery in Creston, British Columbia. Columbia Brewery began brewing Kokanee lager in 1959 and was purchased by the Labatt Brewing Company in 1974.

Labatt Brewing is now a subsidiary of Anheuser-Busch InBev SA/NV, which is trading as BUD on the New York Stock Exchange; (ABI:BB in Brussels.)

== The beer ==
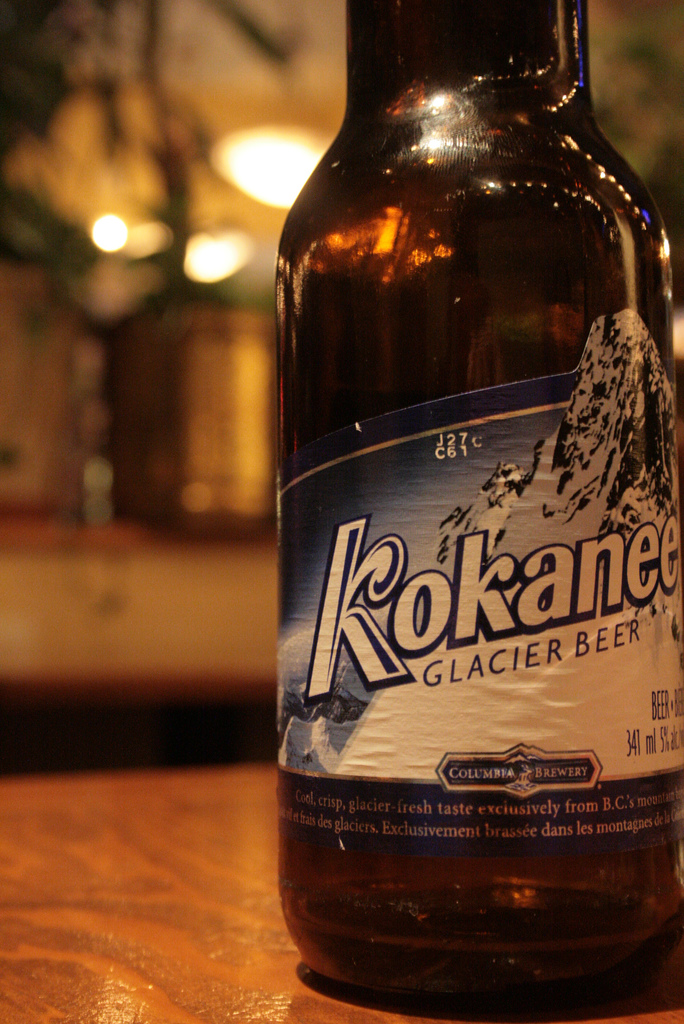
Kokanee bottle

Kokanee is a Pilsner style lager with 5.0% alcohol. Kokanee beer is aged naturally and has a relatively mild taste. It is most commonly found in the Western provinces of Canada and the Pacific Northwest states of the US, with sparse distribution in Eastern provinces and states. The Columbia Brewery also brews Kokanee Gold, with a fuller body and 5.3% alcohol content, Kokanee Light, and Kootenay True Ale.

=== Marketing ===
The company's "Glacier Fresh" marketing slogan for the beer originates from the usage of mountain stream water in its brewing. It uses three varieties of malt and a blend of western grown North American hops.

== Marketing ==
Kokanee was started in the 1960s, and initially its sale was restricted to the residents of the interior of British Columbia due to BC liquor laws. Later, it was marketed with the slogan "Brewed right in the Kootenays". After Labatt bought the Columbia Brewery in 1974, they hired the advertising agency WestCan, later to be known as Scali McCabe Sloves, whose Vancouver office produced a number of humorous radio and then international award-winning TV campaigns introducing "The Sasquatch". Two International Broadcast Awards and both introduced the Sasquatch trademark peak with a 30% plus brand share in 1986. These Sasquatch ads were also featured on the NBC Tonight Show as samples of the "World's Best". Other later efforts included a mock documentary showing Kokanee bottles migrating up a stream like salmon. The brand had a share of 17% in 1992.

In 1992, Labatt hired Beakbane Marketing, Toronto, to redesign the packaging. They changed the icon of the Kokanee Glacier to a photo montage that was shot from a helicopter by nature photographer Alec Pytlowany. The image of the glacier was used on all packaging materials, including bottle labels, cans and cartons. At that time, a small Sasquatch icon was developed and hidden in each design.

The brand was introduced to Ontario in 1996, but to save on shipping, the beer was brewed at Labatt's facility in London, Ontario. Molson Brewery launched a preemptive advertising campaign questioning the beer's legitimacy, with the slogan "B.C. or B.S.?". In 2001, Labatt re-launched Kokanee, trucking it in from the brewery in Creston.

Kokanee's current marketing slogans are "It's The Beer Out Here" and "Glacier Fresh". Kokanee advertisements are frequently shown on Canadian television stations and center around the beer's official mascot, the Sasquatch. Later the ad campaign follows the storyline of the "Kokanee Ranger", played by John Novak; and his unsuccessful attempts to hunt and catch the Sasquatch who is stealing Kokanee beer. These commercials parody the real life Sasquatch hunter René Dahinden, who appeared in the first Kokanee commercial of its kind. According to the ad campaign, the Ranger eventually recruited three Glacier Girls to join the search to catch the elusive Sasquatch. These girls were originally introduced first in 1985 as "The Kokettes".

In 2008, a new campaign encouraged customers to visit a website (RangerLiveOrDie.ca) and vote on whether the Kokanee Ranger should live or die. The campaign concluded on August 17, with the Kokanee Ranger ultimately being killed off in a commercial that spoofed the last few minutes of the final episode of The Sopranos. In 2011, Kokanee launched a Facebook campaign that encouraged Kokanee drinkers to vote for a new Ranger. It is still unknown who, or what, will replace the Ranger as Kokanee's new spokesperson.

A TV ad showed the late Ranger as a ghost resuming his post and duties, discovering he's dead as his hand passes through a bottle of Kokanee, remembering "you killed me off!", and said "good luck". Voters chose from a varied choice of candidates: "Ma Ranger", the mother of the Kokanee Ranger; "Micheal Baystreet" a Gordon Gekko-like TSX day trader; "Cory", a Ski instructor who has skied the Rockies since the '80s; "Beer Fridge 2.0", a beer cooler with a lock; "Glacier and Fresh", a Starsky and Hutchesque buddy duo eager to make their mark by stopping Sasq's crime wave; and "Glacier Goat" a foul mouthed cantankerous goat. The candidates also had individual Facebook pages as fictional characters, posting articles, videos, and responding to fans posts on their pages. Micheal Baystreet, seeks to redevelop the Kootenays with condo high rise apartments, Ma wants to satisfy her widow lusts.

Kokanee drinkers voted for "Glacier and Fresh" after a narrow election victory over runner up "Goat".

In May 2012, Kokanee and Alliance Films announced that it would be producing a feature-length film for release in 2013. Known as The Movie Out Here, the film (which was also co-produced by Grip Limited, the agency behind some of Kokanee's recent campaigns) was promoted by Kokanee using a social media and crowdsourcing-oriented marketing campaign of its own, and serves as Labatt's first experiment with feature-length branded content. Kokanee also sponsored the annual Crankworx mountain biking festival in Whistler, British Columbia.

== Name ==
The beer is named after the Kokanee Glacier in the Kootenays region in which Creston is situated.

== Label ==
The picture on the label consists of a mountain known as Grays Peak in Kokanee Glacier Provincial Park, British Columbia, named after Lt. Robert Hampton Gray, VC, RCNVR, and his brother, Flight Sergeant John Balfour Gray, RCAF, both of whom were killed in World War II. It shows a man or Sasquatch standing on top of one of the peaks. The entity is not in the pictures on Kokanee's box packaging. He appears only on the cans or bottles themselves, and is located in one of five various spots on bottles and in different positions on different cans.

== See also ==
- Columbia Brewery
- Labatt Brewing Company
