= Marcillac-Lanville =

- Commune
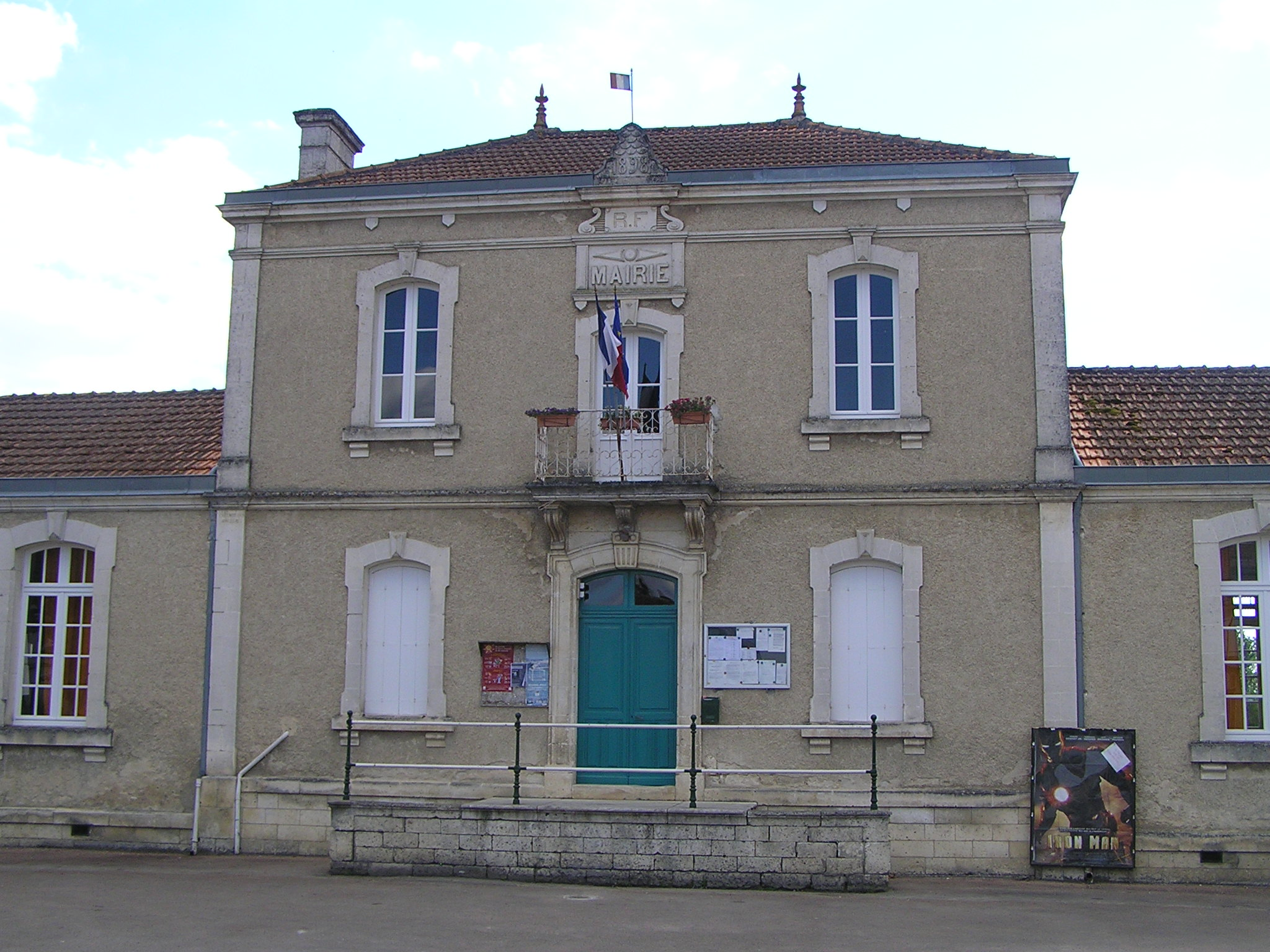
- Town hall
- Location of Marcillac-Lanville
- Location within France Location within Nouvelle-Aquitaine
- Coordinates: 45°50′50″N 0°01′15″E
- Country: France
- Region: Nouvelle-Aquitaine
- Department: Charente
- Arrondissement: Cognac
- Canton: Val de Nouère
- Intercommunality: Rouillacais

Government
  - Mayor (2020–2026): Marie Annic Roy-Plantevigne
- Area^{1}: 18.41 km^{2} (7.11 sq mi)
- Elevation: 108 m (354 ft)
- Highest elevation: 136 m (446 ft)
- Lowest elevation: 47 m (154 ft)
- Population (2023): 521
  - Density: 28.3/km^{2} (73.3/sq mi)
- Time zone: UTC+01:00 (CET)
  - Summer (DST): UTC+02:00 (CEST)
- INSEE/Postal code: 16207 /16140
- ^{1} French Land Register data, which excludes lakes, ponds, glaciers > 1 km^{2} (0.386 sq mi or 247 acres) and river estuaries.

Marcillac-Lanville (French pronunciation: [maʁsijak lɑ̃vil]) is a commune in the Charente department in southwestern France.

== Population ==
Historical population
Year	Pop.	±% p.a.
1968	564	—
1975	576	+0.30%
1982	551	−0.63%
1990	534	−0.39%
1999	565	+0.63%
2007	588	+0.50%
2012	594	+0.20%
2017	511	−2.97%
2023	521	+0.32%
Source: INSEE

== See also ==
- Communes of the Charente department
- Canadian Prime Ministers Pierre and Justin Trudeau can trace their family roots to Marcillac-Lanville
