= Michel Trudeau =

Youngest son of Pierre Trudeau (1975–1998)

- Trudeau in 1998
- Born: Michel Charles-Émile Trudeau; October 2, 1975; Ottawa, Ontario, Canada
- Died: November 13, 1998 (aged 23); Kokanee Lake, British Columbia, Canada
- Education: Dalhousie University
- Parents: Pierre Trudeau (father); Margaret Trudeau (mother)
- Relatives: Trudeau family

Michel Charles-Émile Trudeau (October 2, 1975 – November 13, 1998) was the youngest son of Canadian Prime Minister Pierre Trudeau and Margaret Trudeau and the younger brother of Prime Minister Justin Trudeau. He died in an avalanche on November 13, 1998, while skiing in Kokanee Glacier Provincial Park.

== Biography ==
Trudeau was born at the Ottawa Civic Hospital in Ottawa, Ontario, and partially named after his paternal grandfather, Charles-Émile. He was known to family and friends as Miche, and later started going by the name Mike. Trudeau lived his early life in Ottawa and later Montreal upon his father's retirement from politics in 1984. In Montreal, he was a classmate of Sophie Grégoire who would later marry his brother Justin.

During their summer breaks, Michel and his brothers attended Camp Ahmek on Canoe Lake in Algonquin Provincial Park where he would later work as a camp counsellor. He studied at Collège Jean-de-Brébeuf before attending Dalhousie University to study marine biology. When talking about her sons each having distinctly different personalities in an interview in 1977, Margaret Trudeau said, "Justin, 6, is a prince — a very good little boy. Sasha (Alexandre), born Christmas Day, 1973, is a bit of a revolutionary, very determined and strong-willed. Miche (Michel) is a happy, well-adjusted child, who combined the best traits of both brothers."

== Death ==
On November 13, 1998, Michel Trudeau died as the result of an avalanche. He was aged 23. He had been working for about a year at Red Mountain Resort and living in Rossland, British Columbia. He was taking a backcountry skiing trip with some friends in Kokanee Glacier Provincial Park when he was swept into Kokanee Lake (approximately 49°44'53.2"N 117°10'32.2"W) and unable to reach the shore. His companions were unable to effect a rescue, and it was presumed that Trudeau drowned. An extensive search was launched, but his body was not found. The lake's high elevation and limited days of open waters each year prevented divers from completing the search. The Trudeau family called off the recovery and later supported the construction of a chalet nearby as a memorial to their youngest son and victims of avalanches.

A varietal of rose discovered by Betsy Dening, a British Columbia horticulturist and Trudeau's aunt, debuted at the World Rose Festival in 2010 as the "Michel Trudeau Memorial Rosebush". Sales of the rosebush benefit the Canadian Avalanche Foundation.
