= Kokanee Glacier Provincial Park =

Canadian provincial park

- IUCN category II (national park)
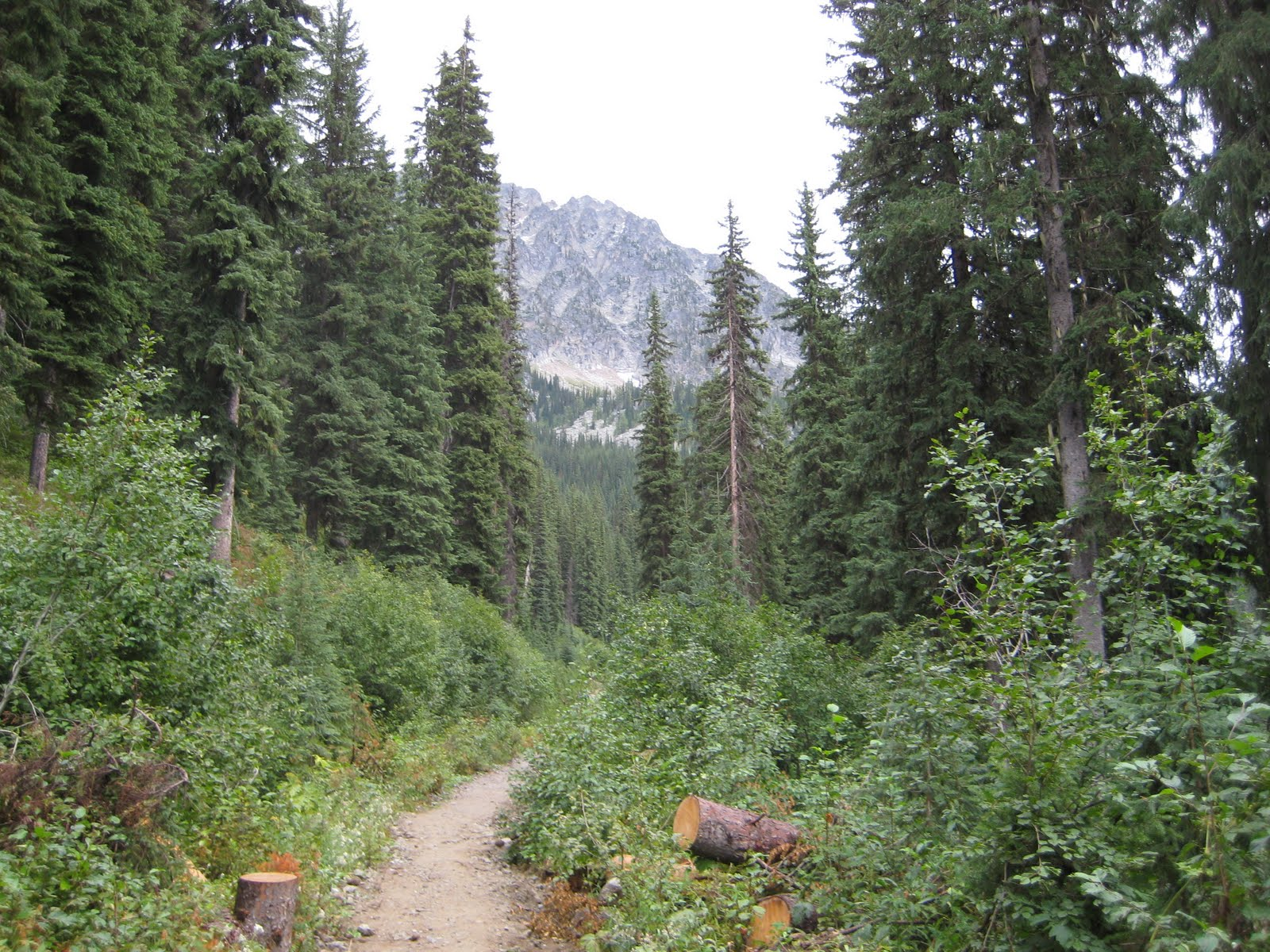
- Kokanee Glacier Provincial Park

- Location within British Columbia
- Interactive map of Kokanee Glacier Provincial Park
- Location: Central Kootenay, British Columbia, Canada
- Nearest city: Nelson, British Columbia
- Coordinates: 49°47′00″N 117°10′00″W
- Area: 32,035 ha (123.69 sq mi)
- Governing body: BC Parks
- Website: bcparks.ca/explore/parkpgs/kokanee_gl/

Kokanee Glacier Provincial Park is one of the oldest provincial parks in British Columbia, established in 1922. The park has an area of 320.35 km^{2} (123.69 sq mi) and is located in the Selkirk Mountains in the West Kootenays region of BC. The park has three glaciers (Kokanee, Caribou, and Woodbury) that feed over 30 alpine lakes which are the headwaters of many creeks.

There are five access roads entering the park, which were developed as mining and forestry roads along the major drainages. The nearest towns are Nelson, Ainsworth, Kaslo and Slocan City (access is primarily from Nelson and Kaslo). Pierre Trudeau's youngest son, Michel, was killed in an avalanche in 1998 while skiing at the park.

== IUCN Category II ==
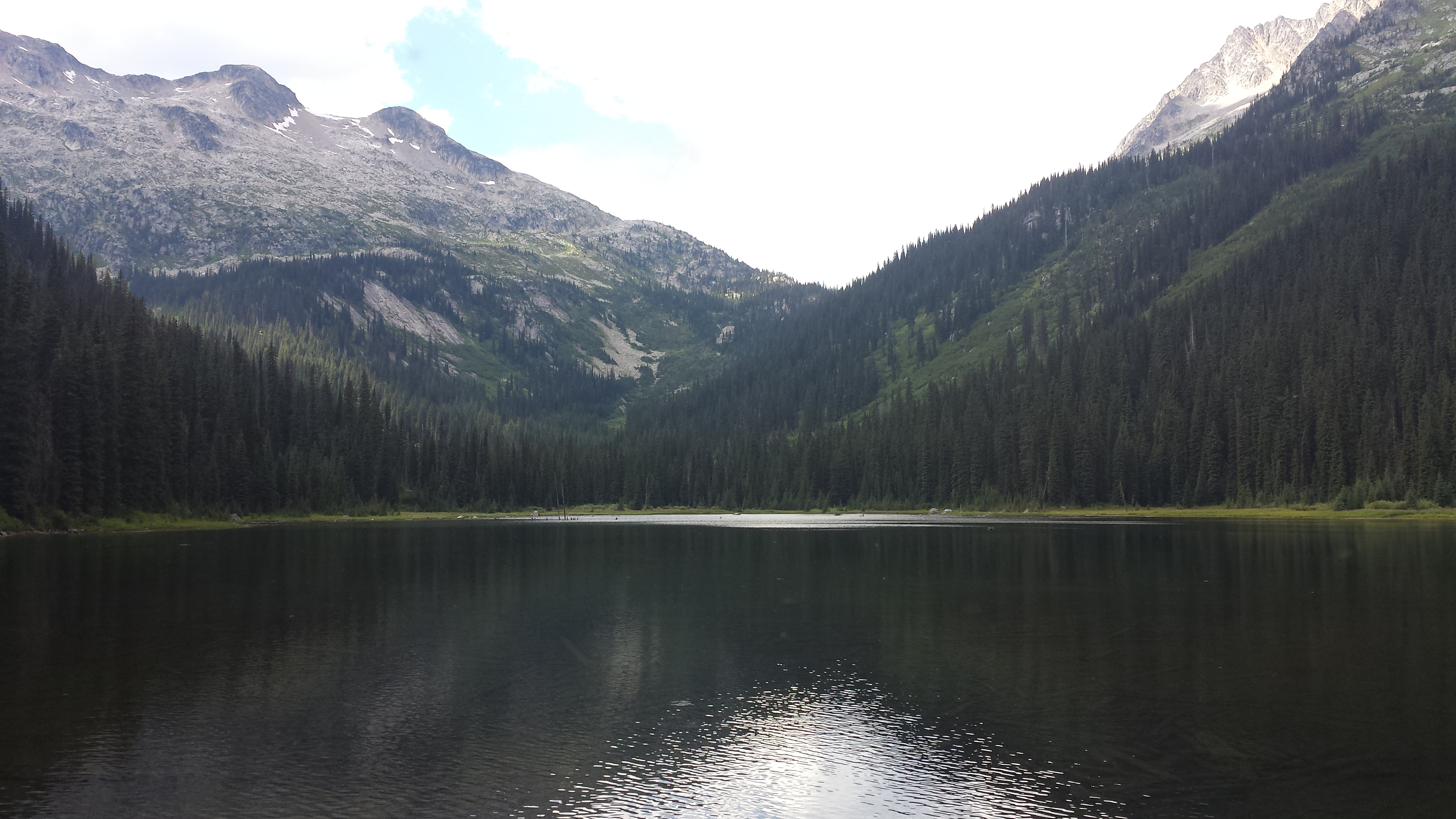
Gibson Lake with Mt John Carter to the left

The International Union for Conservation of Nature (IUCN) has designated Kokanee Glacier Park as a category II protected area (national park), though it is actually administered by the provincial government of British Columbia.

== Grays Peak ==
Grays Peak is a prominent mountain in the park. Named after Robert Hampton Gray (VC) and his brother, John Balfour Gray, the peak is notable as the mountain featured on the label of Kokanee beer.

== See also ==
- Kokanee (disambiguation)
- Kokanee Creek Provincial Park
- Valhalla Provincial Park
