= Charles-Émile Trudeau =

French Canadian businessman (1887–1935)

- Born: Joseph Charles-Émile Trudeau; July 5, 1887; Saint-Michel-de-Napierville, Quebec, Canada
- Died: April 10, 1935 (aged 47); Orlando, Florida, US
- Occupations: Entrepreneur, lawyer
- Spouse: Grace Elliott (m. 1915)
- Children: 4, including Pierre Trudeau
- Relatives: Trudeau family

Joseph Charles-Émile "Charley" Trudeau (French pronunciation: [ʒozɛf ʃaʁlemil tʁydo]; July 5, 1887 – April 10, 1935) was a French Canadian attorney and businessman. He was the father of Pierre Trudeau, the 15th Prime Minister of Canada, and the paternal grandfather of Justin Trudeau, the 23rd Prime Minister of Canada.

== Life and career ==
Charles-Émile Trudeau was born on his family's farm in Saint-Michel-de-Napierville, Quebec, the son of Joseph-Louis Trudeau (1848–1919), a semi-literate farmer, and Malvina Cardinal (1849–1931), whose own father was Solime Cardinal (1815–1897), mayor of Saint-Constant, Quebec. Malvina insisted that her sons be given a strong education; her husband agreed to send them to College Sainte-Marie. Trudeau later studied law at the Laval University's campus in Montreal, which in 1919 became the University of Montreal. After a ten-year courtship, he married Grace Elliott (1890–1973), the daughter of a prominent Scots-Quebecer entrepreneur, Philip Armstrong Elliott (1859–1936), and his wife Sarah Sauvé (1857–1899), on May 11, 1915, in Montreal at the original Saint-Louis-de-France Roman Catholic Church on Roy Street at Laval Avenue, which was later destroyed by fire in 1933. They had four children, their first child dying at birth. Charles-Émile Trudeau was considered gregarious, boisterous, and extravagant.

Trudeau, a lawyer by training, practised for 10 years with Ernest Bertrand, at that time the senior Crown prosecutor, as well as with Charles E. Guérin. Trudeau accumulated a fortune by building gas stations around the Montreal area and a loyalty program known as the Automobile Owners' Association, which by 1932 had 15,000 members patronizing Trudeau's 30 stations. He sold his business to Champlain Oil Products Limited for $1 million, while remaining with Champlain as general manager for that subsidiary. Among his other investments, Trudeau had interests in mining companies. He was a noted baseball enthusiast: he was the largest shareholder and member of the board of directors of the Montreal Royals baseball team, and the team's vice-president at the time of his death. He was also vice president of Montreal's Belmont Park and a prominent philanthropist, including as a benefactor of the Hôpital Sainte-Jeanne d'Arc, for which he also served as director at the time of his death.

Politically, Trudeau was a strong supporter of the Conservative Party, as opposed to Prime Minister William Lyon Mackenzie King, the longtime leader of the Liberal Party. Pierre Trudeau recalled that "political arguments never lacked liveliness" between Charles and his friends.

== Death and legacy ==
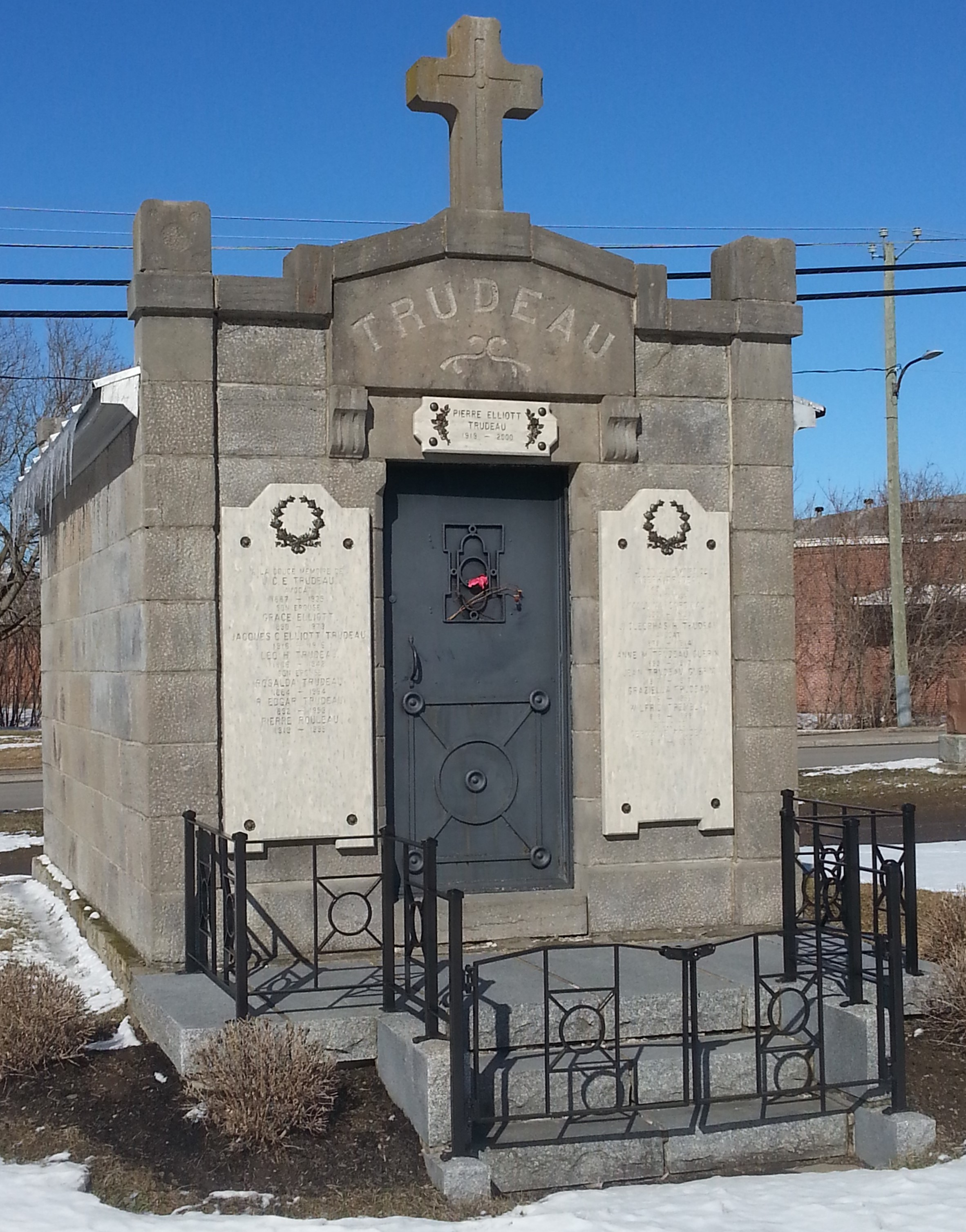
Trudeau family mausoleum

He died of pneumonia in 1935 in Orlando, Florida, while on the road with the Royals baseball team. He was laid to rest in the Trudeau family mausoleum at St-Rémi-de-Napierville Cemetery in Saint-Rémi, Quebec.

Due to Trudeau's business, Pierre Trudeau himself inherited wealth. As Jim Coutts, Pierre Trudeau's aide, recalled, Trudeau "talked, at times, of his father, whom he greatly admired, but who was too busy to understand his son's interests or spend much time with him." Pierre Trudeau named his third son, Michel Charles Émile Trudeau, after him.
