= Justin Trudeau =

Prime Minister of Canada from 2015 to 2025

The Right Honourable Justin Trudeau PC
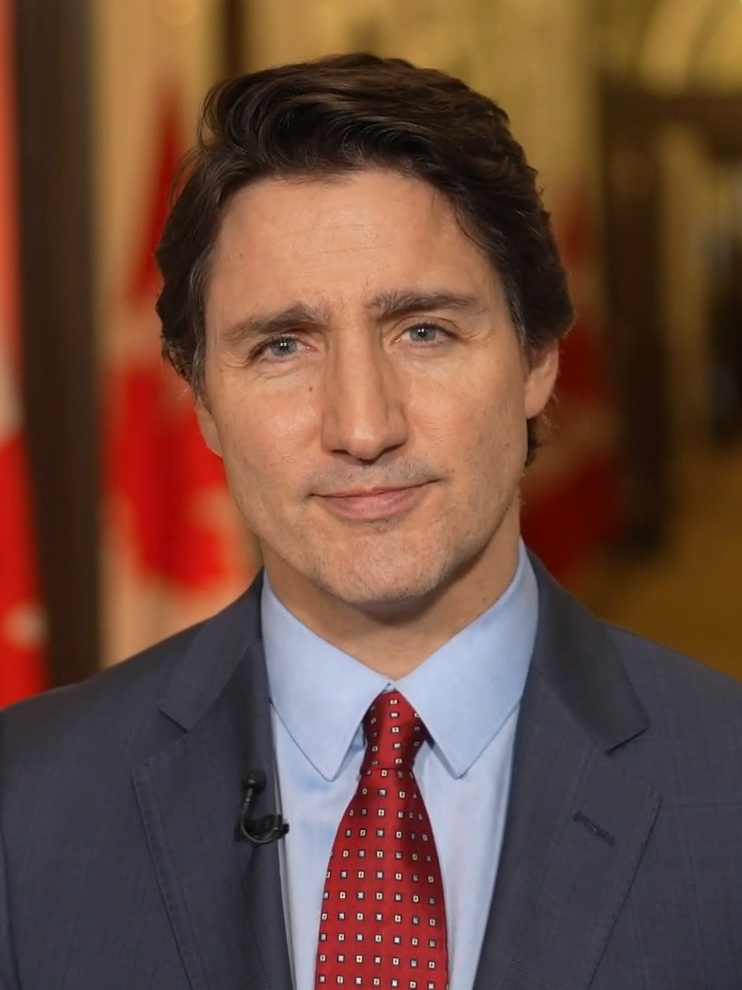
- Trudeau in 2023

23rd Prime Minister of Canada
- In office November 4, 2015 – March 14, 2025
- Monarchs: Elizabeth II; Charles III
- Governors General: David Johnston; Julie Payette; Mary Simon
- Deputy: Chrystia Freeland (2019–2024)
- Preceded by: Stephen Harper
- Succeeded by: Mark Carney

Leader of the Liberal Party
- In office April 14, 2013 – March 9, 2025
- Deputy: Ralph Goodale (2013–2015)
- Preceded by: Bob Rae (interim)
- Succeeded by: Mark Carney

Minister of Intergovernmental Affairs and Youth
- In office November 4, 2015 – July 18, 2018 (Note: Trudeau was succeeded as minister of intergovernmental affairs on July 18, 2018, but continued to serve as minister of youth until November 19, 2019.)
- Prime Minister: Himself
- Preceded by: Denis Lebel (Note: The Cabinet position was titled "minister of infrastructure, communities and intergovernmental affairs".)
- Succeeded by: Dominic LeBlanc (Note: LeBlanc succeeded Trudeau in the Cabinet position, but with the title "minister of intergovernmental and northern affairs and internal trade".)

Member of Parliament for Papineau
- In office October 14, 2008 – April 28, 2025
- Preceded by: Vivian Barbot
- Succeeded by: Marjorie Michel

Personal details
- Born: Justin Pierre James Trudeau; December 25, 1971 (age 54) Ottawa, Ontario, Canada
- Party: Liberal
- Spouse: Sophie Grégoire (m. 2005; sep. 2023)
- Children: 3, including Xavier
- Parents: Pierre Trudeau; Margaret Trudeau
- Relatives: Trudeau family
- Education: McGill University (BA); University of British Columbia (BEd); École Polytechnique de Montréal (no degree)
- Occupation: Politician; teacher
- Website: House of Commons website
- Justin Trudeau's voice Trudeau celebrating Canada Day; Recorded July 1, 2018

Justin Pierre James Trudeau (Note: Pronounced /ˈtruːdoʊ, truːˈdoʊ/ TROO-doh, troo-DOH; French: [ʒystɛ̃ pjɛʁ dʒɛms tʁydo].) (born December 25, 1971) is a Canadian politician who served as the 23rd prime minister of Canada from 2015 to 2025. He led the Liberal Party from 2013 until his resignation in 2025 and was the member of Parliament (MP) for Papineau from 2008 until 2025.

Trudeau was born in Ottawa, Ontario, as the eldest child of then prime minister Pierre Trudeau. He attended Collège Jean-de-Brébeuf and holds a Bachelor of Arts degree in English from McGill University and a Bachelor of Education degree from the University of British Columbia. He then taught at the secondary school level in Vancouver before returning to Montreal in 2002 to further his studies. From 2002 to 2006, he served as chair of Katimavik, a youth charity. In 2006, he became chair of the Liberal Party's Task Force on Youth Renewal. In the 2008 federal election, Trudeau was elected to represent the riding of Papineau in the House of Commons. He was appointed the Liberal Party's Official Opposition critic for youth and multiculturalism in 2009 and critic for citizenship and immigration in 2010. In 2011, he was appointed to be a critic for post secondary education, youth and sport. Trudeau was elected as leader of the Liberal Party in 2013. In the 2015 federal election, Trudeau led the Liberals to a majority government, bringing the party from third party status with the largest-ever numerical increase of seats by a party in a Canadian election. Aged 43, he became the second-youngest prime minister in Canadian history (after Joe Clark) and was the first to be the child of a previous prime minister.

Upon assuming office, Trudeau introduced the Canada Child Benefit, legalized medical assistance in dying, legalized recreational cannabis, pursued Senate reform by creating the Independent Advisory Board for Senate Appointments, and established the federal carbon tax. In foreign policy, Trudeau's government resettled refugees of the Syrian civil war, signed the Paris Agreement on climate change, and negotiated trade deals such as the Canada-United States-Mexico Agreement (CUSMA) and the Comprehensive and Progressive Agreement for Trans-Pacific Partnership (CPTPP). He was found twice to have violated conflict of interest law by Canada's ethics commissioner—first in the Aga Khan affair, and later in the SNC-Lavalin affair.

Trudeau's Liberal Party was re-elected with a minority government in the 2019 federal election. From 2020, Trudeau responded to the COVID-19 pandemic and subsequent recession by launching financial aid measures, a nationwide vaccination campaign, and military support. His government also announced a ban on "assault-style" weapons after the 2020 Nova Scotia attacks and introduced a national $10-a-day child care program. He was investigated for a third time by the ethics commissioner for his role in the WE Charity scandal, but was cleared of any wrongdoing. Trudeau led the Liberals to another minority government in the 2021 federal election. He then invoked the Emergencies Act for the first time in Canadian history in response to the Freedom Convoy protests; the Federal Court later ruled against this action. His party signed a confidence and supply agreement with the New Democratic Party (NDP) in early 2022, which resulted in the introduction of the Canadian Dental Care Plan and a framework for national pharmacare before the NDP withdrew from the agreement in late 2024. He also launched a national school food program. Internationally, Trudeau's government responded to the Russian invasion of Ukraine by imposing sanctions on Russia and authorizing humanitarian and military aid to Ukraine. His premiership ended during a trade war with the United States, to which he responded by introducing 25% retaliatory tariffs on $30 billion of U.S. goods.

Following a steady decline in popular support, the sudden resignation of deputy prime minister Chrystia Freeland in December 2024 and an ensuing political crisis, Trudeau announced in January 2025 that he would resign as prime minister and leader of the Liberal Party. He advised the governor general to prorogue Parliament until March 24, while the party held a leadership election. Trudeau remained Liberal leader until Mark Carney was elected as his successor on March 9. He resigned as prime minister five days later and stood down as an MP at the 2025 federal election.

== Early life and education ==
=== Ancestry and birth ===
On June 23, 1971, the Prime Minister's Office (PMO) announced that Prime Minister Pierre Trudeau's wife of four months, Margaret Trudeau (née Sinclair), was pregnant and due in December. Justin Trudeau was born on December 25, 1971, at 9:27 pm EST at the Ottawa Civic Hospital. He is the second child in Canadian history to be born to a prime minister in office; the first was John A. Macdonald's daughter Margaret Mary Theodora Macdonald (February 8, 1869 – January 28, 1933). Trudeau's younger brothers Alexandre "Sacha" (born December 25, 1973) and Michel (October 2, 1975 – November 13, 1998) were the third and fourth.

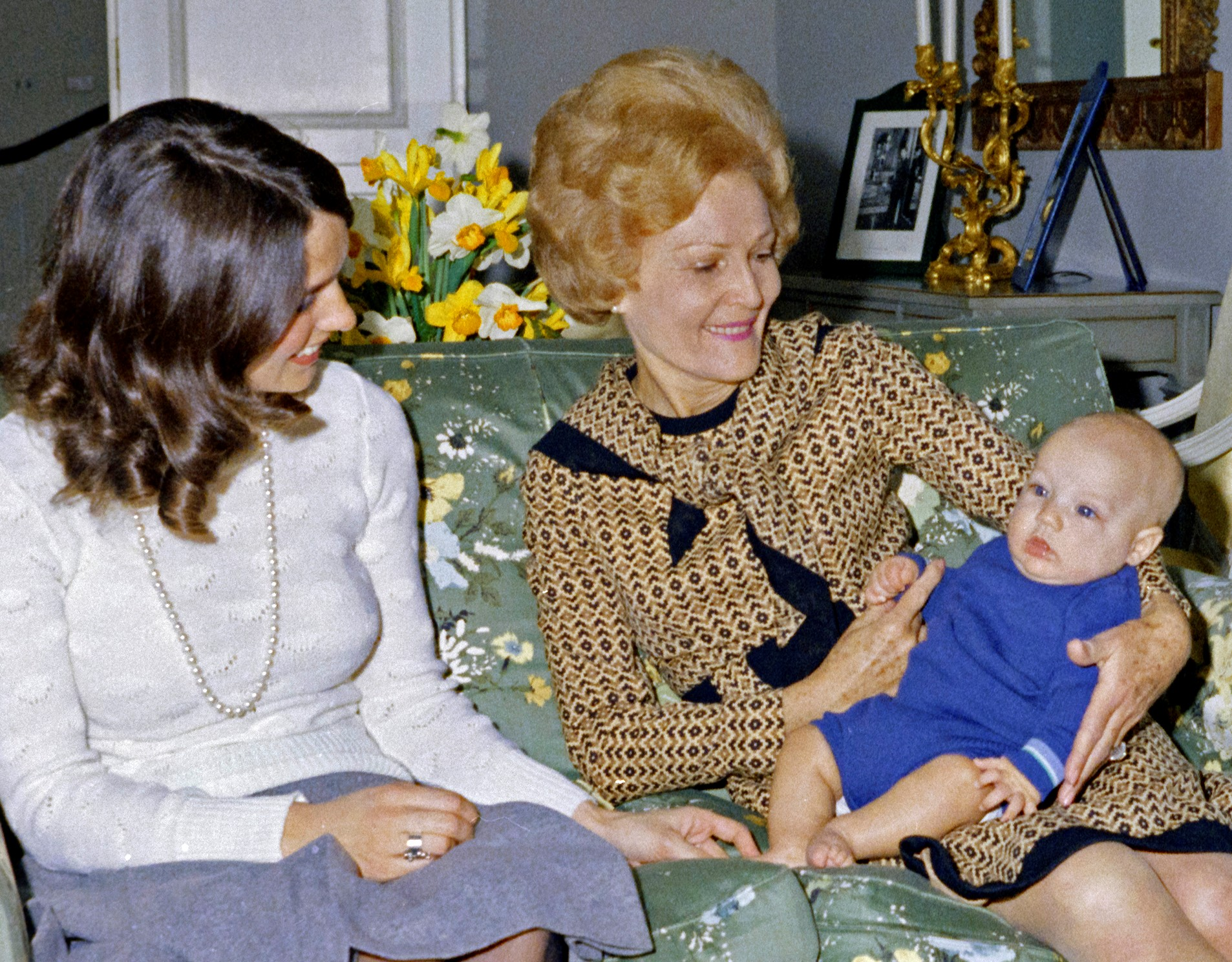
Margaret Trudeau with Pat Nixon holding Justin at Rideau Hall in Ottawa in 1972

Trudeau is predominantly of Scottish and French Canadian descent. His grandfathers were businessman Charles-Émile Trudeau and Scottish-born James Sinclair, who was minister of fisheries in the cabinet of Prime Minister Louis St. Laurent. Trudeau's maternal great-grandfather Thomas Bernard was born in Makassar, Indonesia and immigrated to Penticton, British Columbia, in 1906 at age 15 with his family. Through the Bernard family, kinsmen of the Earls of Bandon, Trudeau is the fifth great-grandson of Major-General William Farquhar, a leader in the founding of modern Singapore; Trudeau also has remote ethnic Malaccan and Nias ancestry.

Trudeau was baptized with his father's niece Anne Rouleau-Danis as godmother and his mother's brother-in-law Thomas Walker as godfather, at Ottawa's Notre Dame Basilica on the afternoon of January 16, 1972, which marked his first public appearance. He was given the name "Justin Pierre James". On April 14, 1972, Trudeau's father and mother hosted a gala at the National Arts Centre, at which visiting U.S. president Richard Nixon said, "I'd like to toast the future prime minister of Canada, to Justin Pierre Trudeau" to which Pierre Trudeau responded that should his son ever assume the role, he hoped he would have "the grace and skill of the president". Earlier that day, first lady Pat Nixon had visited him in his nursery and gifted him a stuffed toy Snoopy.

=== Childhood ===
Trudeau's parents announced their separation in 1977, when he was five years old; his father was given primary custody. There were repeated rumours of a reconciliation for many years afterwards. However, his mother eventually filed for a no-fault divorce which the Supreme Court of Ontario granted in 1984; his father had announced his intention to retire as prime minister a month earlier. Eventually, his parents came to an amicable joint-custody arrangement and learned to get along quite well. Interviewed in October 1979, his nanny Dianne Lavergne was quoted, "Justin is a mommy's boy, so it's not easy, but children's hurts mend very quickly. And they're lucky kids, anyway." Of his mother and father's marriage, Trudeau said in 2009, "They loved each other incredibly, passionately, completely. But there was 30 years between them, and my mom never was an equal partner in what encompassed my father's life, his duty, his country." Trudeau has three half-siblings, Kyle and Alicia, from his mother's remarriage to Fried Kemper, and Sarah, from his father's relationship with Deborah Coyne.

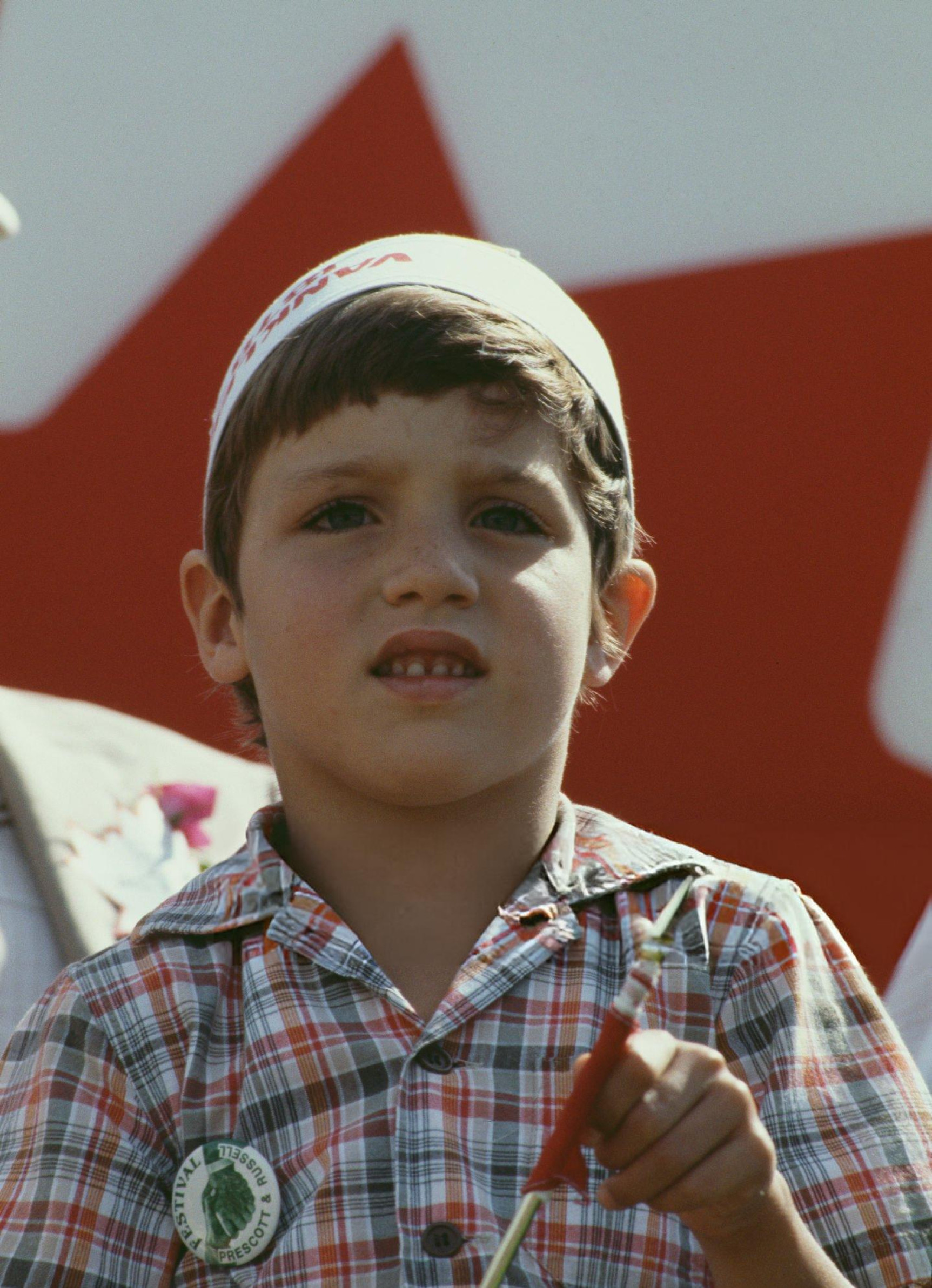
Trudeau watching a parade in Ottawa, June 1978

Trudeau lived at 24 Sussex Drive, Ottawa, the official residence of Canada's prime minister, from his birth until his father's government was defeated in the 1979 federal election. The Trudeaus were expected to move into Stornoway, the residence of the leader of the Official Opposition, but because of flooding in the basement, Prime Minister Joe Clark offered them Harrington Lake, the prime minister's official country retreat in Gatineau Park, with the expectation they would move into Stornoway at the start of July. However, the repairs were not complete, so Pierre Trudeau took a prolonged vacation with his sons to the Nova Scotia summer home of his friend, Member of Parliament Don Johnston, and later sent his sons to stay with their maternal grandparents in North Vancouver for the rest of the summer while he slept at his friend's Ottawa apartment. Trudeau and his brothers returned to Ottawa for the start of the school year but lived only on the top floor of Stornoway while repairs continued on the bottom floor. His mother purchased and moved into a new home nearby at 95 Victoria Street in Ottawa's New Edinburgh neighbourhood in September 1979. Pierre Trudeau and his sons returned to the prime minister's official residence after the February 1980 election that returned him to the Prime Minister's Office.

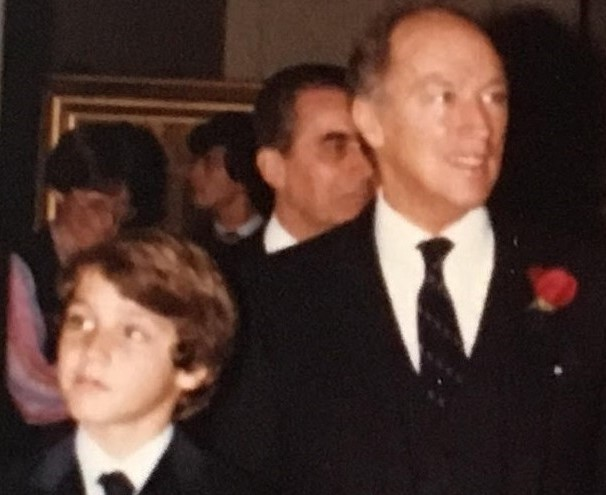
10-year-old Justin touring the Palais des Beaux-Arts de Lille in France with his father in 1982

His father had intended Trudeau to begin his formal education at a French-language lycée, but Trudeau's mother convinced his father of the importance of sending their sons to a public school. In the end, Trudeau was enrolled in 1976 in the French immersion program at Rockcliffe Park Public School. It was the same school his mother had attended for two years while her father was a member of Parliament. He could have been dropped off by limousine, but his parents chose to have him take the school bus, albeit with a Royal Canadian Mounted Police (RCMP) car following.

After his father's retirement in June 1984, his mother remained at her New Edinburgh home while the rest of the family moved into his father's home at 1418 Pine Avenue, Montreal known as Cormier House; the following autumn, he began attending the private Collège Jean-de-Brébeuf, his father's alma mater. The school had begun as a Jesuit school but was non-denominational by the time Justin matriculated. In 2008, Trudeau said that of all his early family outings he enjoyed camping with his father the most, because "that was where our father got to be just our father – a dad in the woods". During the summers his father would send him and his brothers to Camp Ahmek, on Canoe Lake in Algonquin Provincial Park, where he would later work in his first paid job as a camp counsellor.

Trudeau and his brothers were given shares in two numbered companies by their father: the first containing a portfolio of securities, from which they receive regular dividends, up to $20,000 per year; and the second which receives royalties from their father's autobiography and other sources, about $10,000 a year. As of August 2011, the first numbered company had assets of $1.2 million. The Trudeau brothers were also given a country estate of about 50 hectares in the Laurentians with a home designed by the esteemed Canadian architect Arthur Erickson, and the Cormier House in Montreal. The country estate land was estimated to be worth $2.7 million in 2016.

=== University and early career ===
Trudeau earned a Bachelor of Arts degree in literature from McGill University in 1994 and a Bachelor of Education degree from the University of British Columbia in 1998. In his first year at McGill, Trudeau became acquainted with his future principal secretary, Gerald Butts, through their mutual friend, Jonathan Ablett. Butts invited Trudeau to join the McGill Debating Union. They bonded while driving back to Montreal after a debate tournament at Princeton University. After graduation, Trudeau stayed in Vancouver where he became a substitute teacher at local schools such as Killarney Secondary and worked permanently as a French and math teacher at the private West Point Grey Academy. He became a roommate at the Douglas Lodge with fellow West Point Grey Academy faculty member and friend Christopher Ingvaldson. From 2002 to 2004, he studied engineering at the École Polytechnique de Montréal, affiliated with Université de Montréal, but did not graduate. He started a master's degree in environmental geography at McGill but withdrew from the program to seek public office.

In August 2000, Trudeau attended the Kokanee Summit in Creston, British Columbia, to raise funds in honour of his brother Michel Trudeau and other avalanche victims. After the event, an unsigned editorial in the Creston Valley Advance (a local newspaper) accused Trudeau of having groped an unnamed female reporter while at the music festival. The editorial stated Trudeau provided a "day-late" apology to the reporter, saying, "If I had known you were reporting for a national paper, I never would have been so forward". In 2018, Trudeau was questioned about the groping incident but said he did not remember any negative incidents from that time. His apology and later statement about the event have been described as hypocritical, while responses to the story have described it as a witch hunt or non-story.

External videos
- "Trudeau delivers the eulogy at his father Pierre Trudeau's funeral". – The National – CBC/Radio-Canada, October 3, 2000. (12:07 mins). Archive (12:02 mins)

In October 2000, Trudeau, then 28, emerged as a prominent figure after delivering a eulogy at his father's state funeral. The Canadian Broadcasting Corporation (CBC) received numerous calls to rebroadcast the speech after its initial transmission, and leading Quebec politician Claude Ryan described it as "perhaps ... the first manifestation of a dynasty". A book issued by the CBC in 2003 included the speech in its list of significant Canadian events from the past fifty years.

In 2007, Trudeau starred in the two-part CBC Television miniseries The Great War, which gave an account of Canada's participation in the First World War. He portrayed his fifth cousin, twice removed, Major Talbot Mercer Papineau, who was killed on October 30, 1917, during the Battle of Passchendaele. Trudeau is one of several children of former prime ministers who have become Canadian media personalities. The others are Ben Mulroney (son of Brian Mulroney), Catherine Clark (daughter of Joe Clark), and Trudeau's younger brother, Alexandre. Ben Mulroney was a guest at Trudeau's wedding.

=== Advocacy ===
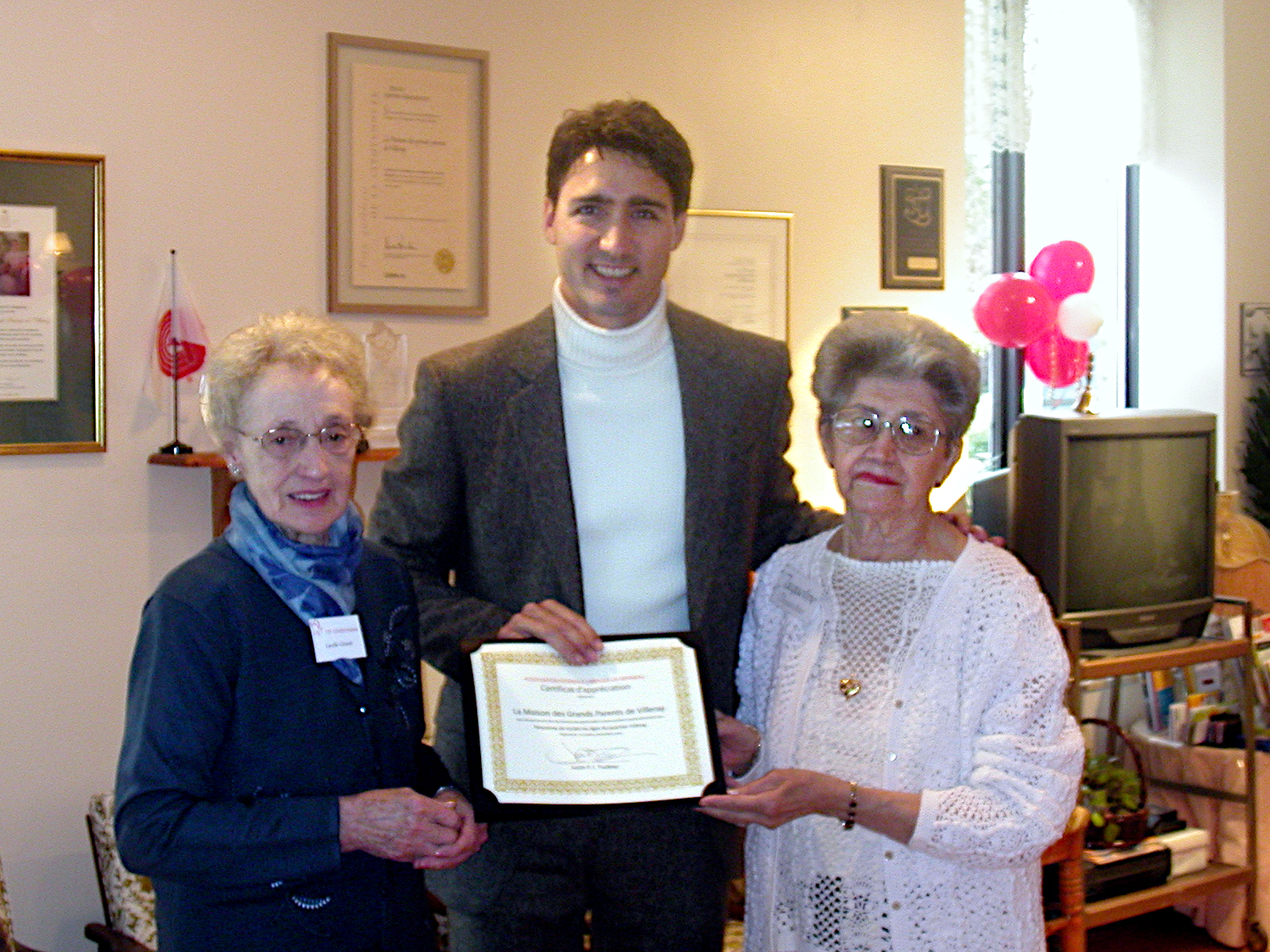
Trudeau (middle) in 2007 with "Maison des Grands-Parents" co-founders Lucille Girard and Jacqueline Desjardins, during the 15th anniversary of the non-profit seniors organization.

Trudeau and his family started the Kokanee Glacier Alpine Campaign for winter sports safety in 2000, two years after his brother Michel died in an avalanche during a ski trip. In 2002, Trudeau criticized the Government of British Columbia's decision to stop its funding for a public avalanche warning system.

From 2002 to 2006, Trudeau chaired the Katimavik youth program, a project started by longtime family friend Jacques Hébert.

In 2002–03, Trudeau was a panellist on CBC Radio's Canada Reads series, where he championed The Colony of Unrequited Dreams by Wayne Johnston. Trudeau and his brother Alexandre inaugurated the Trudeau Centre for Peace and Conflict Studies at the University of Toronto in April 2004; the centre later became a part of the Munk School of Global Affairs. In 2006, he hosted the presentation ceremony for the Giller Prize for literature.

In 2005, Trudeau fought against a proposed $100-million zinc mine that he argued would poison the Nahanni River, a United Nations World Heritage Site located in the Northwest Territories. He was quoted as saying, "The river is an absolutely magnificent, magical place. I'm not saying mining is wrong ... but that is not the place for it. It's just the wrong thing to be doing."

On September 17, 2006, Trudeau was the master of ceremonies at a Toronto rally organized by Roméo Dallaire that called for Canadian participation in resolving the Darfur crisis.

== Political beginnings ==
Trudeau supported the Liberal Party from a young age, offering his support to party leader John Turner in the 1988 federal election. Two years later, he defended Canadian federalism at a student event at the Collège Jean-de-Brébeuf, which he attended.

Following his father's death, Trudeau became more involved with the Liberal Party throughout the 2000s. Along with Olympian Charmaine Crooks, he co-hosted a tribute to outgoing prime minister Jean Chrétien at the party's 2003 leadership convention, and was appointed to chair a task force on youth renewal after the party's defeat in the 2006 federal election.

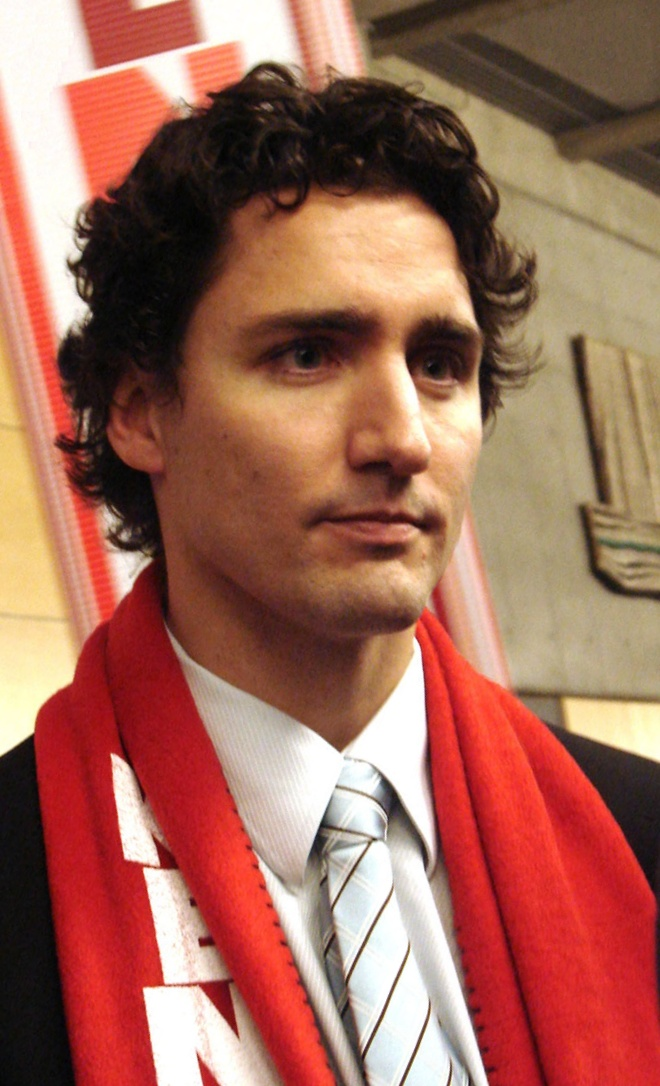
Trudeau at the 2006 Liberal Party leadership convention.

In October 2006, Trudeau criticized Quebec nationalism by describing political nationalism generally as an "old idea from the 19th century", "based on a smallness of thought" and not relevant to modern Quebec. This comment was seen as a criticism of Michael Ignatieff, then a candidate in the 2006 Liberal Party leadership election, who was promoting recognition of Quebec as a nation. Trudeau later wrote a public letter on the subject, describing the idea of Quebec nationhood as "against everything my father ever believed".

Trudeau announced his support for leadership candidate Gerard Kennedy shortly before the 2006 convention and introduced Kennedy during the candidates' final speeches. When Kennedy dropped out after the second ballot, Trudeau joined him in supporting the ultimate winner, Stéphane Dion.

Rumours circulated in early 2007 that Trudeau would run in an upcoming by-election in the Montreal riding of Outremont. The Montreal newspaper La Presse reported despite Trudeau's keenness, Liberal leader Stéphane Dion wanted Outremont for a star candidate who could help rebuild the Liberal Party. Instead, Trudeau announced that he would seek the Liberal nomination in the nearby riding of Papineau for the next general election. The riding, which had been held for 26 years by André Ouellet, a senior minister under his father, had been in Liberal hands for 53 years before falling to the Bloc Québécois in 2006.

On April 29, 2007, Trudeau won the Liberal party's nomination, winning 690 votes to 350 for Mary Deros, a Montreal city councillor, and 220 for Basilio Giordano, the publisher of a local Italian-language newspaper.

== Opposition (2008–2015) ==
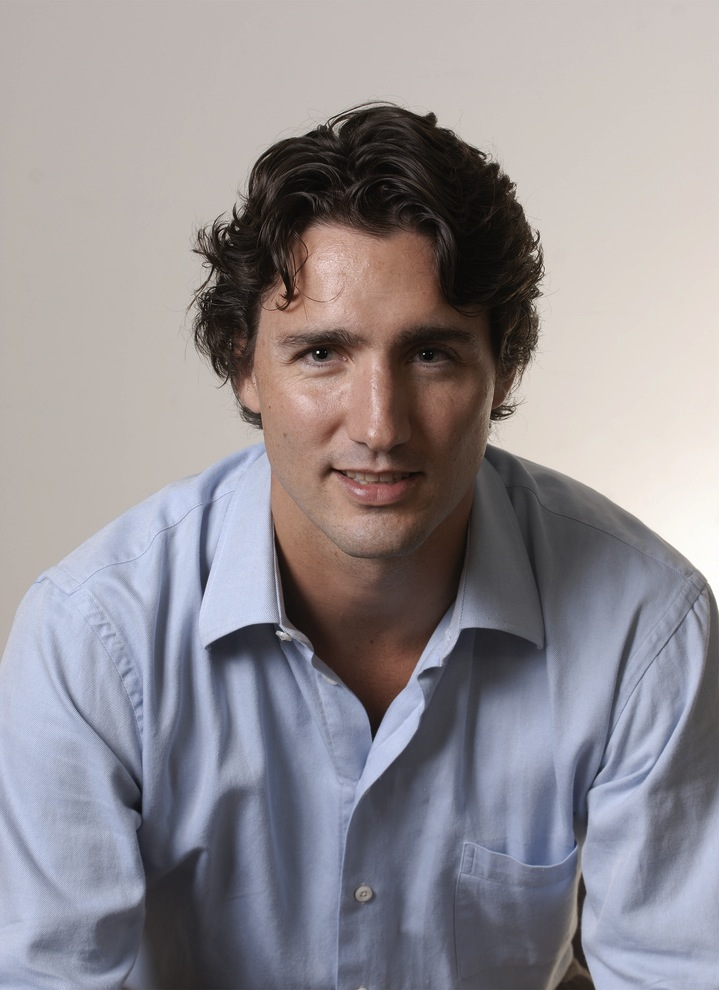
2008 Trudeau promotional portrait by Jean-Marc Carisse

Prime Minister Stephen Harper called an election for October 14, 2008, by which time Trudeau had been campaigning for a year in Papineau. On election day, Trudeau narrowly defeated Bloc Québécois incumbent Vivian Barbot. Following his election win, Edward Greenspon, editor-in-chief of The Globe and Mail, noted that Trudeau would "be viewed as few other rookie MPs are—as a potential future Prime Minister—and scrutinized through that lens".

The Conservative Party won a minority government in the 2008 election, and Trudeau entered parliament as a member of the Official Opposition. Trudeau's first legislative act was a motion that called for the creation of a "national voluntary service policy for young people". He later co-chaired the Liberal Party's April 2009 national convention in Vancouver, and in October of the same year he was appointed as the party's critic for multiculturalism and youth.

In September 2010, he was reassigned as critic for youth, citizenship, and immigration. During that time, he criticized the government's legislation targeting human smuggling, which he argued would penalize the victims of smuggling.

Trudeau sparked controversy when it was revealed that he earned $1.3 million in public speaking fees from charities and school boards across Canada, $277,000 of which Trudeau received after becoming an MP.

He encouraged an increase of Canada's relief efforts after the 2010 Haiti earthquake, and sought more accessible immigration procedures for Haitians moving to Canada in the time of crisis. His own riding includes a significant Haitian community.

Trudeau was re-elected in Papineau in the 2011 federal election, as the Liberal Party fell to third-party standing in the House of Commons with only thirty-four seats. Ignatieff resigned as party leader immediately after the election, and rumours again circulated that Trudeau could run to become his successor. On this occasion, Trudeau said, "I don't feel I should be closing off any options... because of the history packaged into my name, a lot of people are turning to me in a way that... to be blunt, concerns me." Weeks after the election, Toronto MP Bob Rae was selected as the interim leader until the party's leadership convention, which was later decided to be held in April 2013. Rae appointed Trudeau as the party's critic for post-secondary education, youth and amateur sport. After his re-election, he travelled the country hosting fundraisers for charities and the Liberal Party.

Trudeau wanted to take part in a charity boxing match on behalf of the cancer research fundraising event Fight for the Cure, but was having difficulty finding a Conservative opponent until Conservative senator Patrick Brazeau agreed when asked on Trudeau's behalf by their mutual hairdresser Stefania Capovilla. The fight took place on March 31, 2012, at the Hampton Inn in Ottawa, and it was broadcast live on Sun News with commentary by Ezra Levant and Brian Lilley. Trudeau won in the third round; the result was considered an upset.

=== Leader of the Liberal Party ===
==== Earlier speculation ====
After Dion's resignation as Liberal leader in 2008, Trudeau's name was mentioned as a potential candidate with polls showing him as a favourite among Canadians for the position.

However, Trudeau did not enter the race and Michael Ignatieff was named leader in December 2008. After the party's poor showing in the 2011 election, Ignatieff resigned from the leadership and Trudeau was again seen as a potential candidate to lead the party.

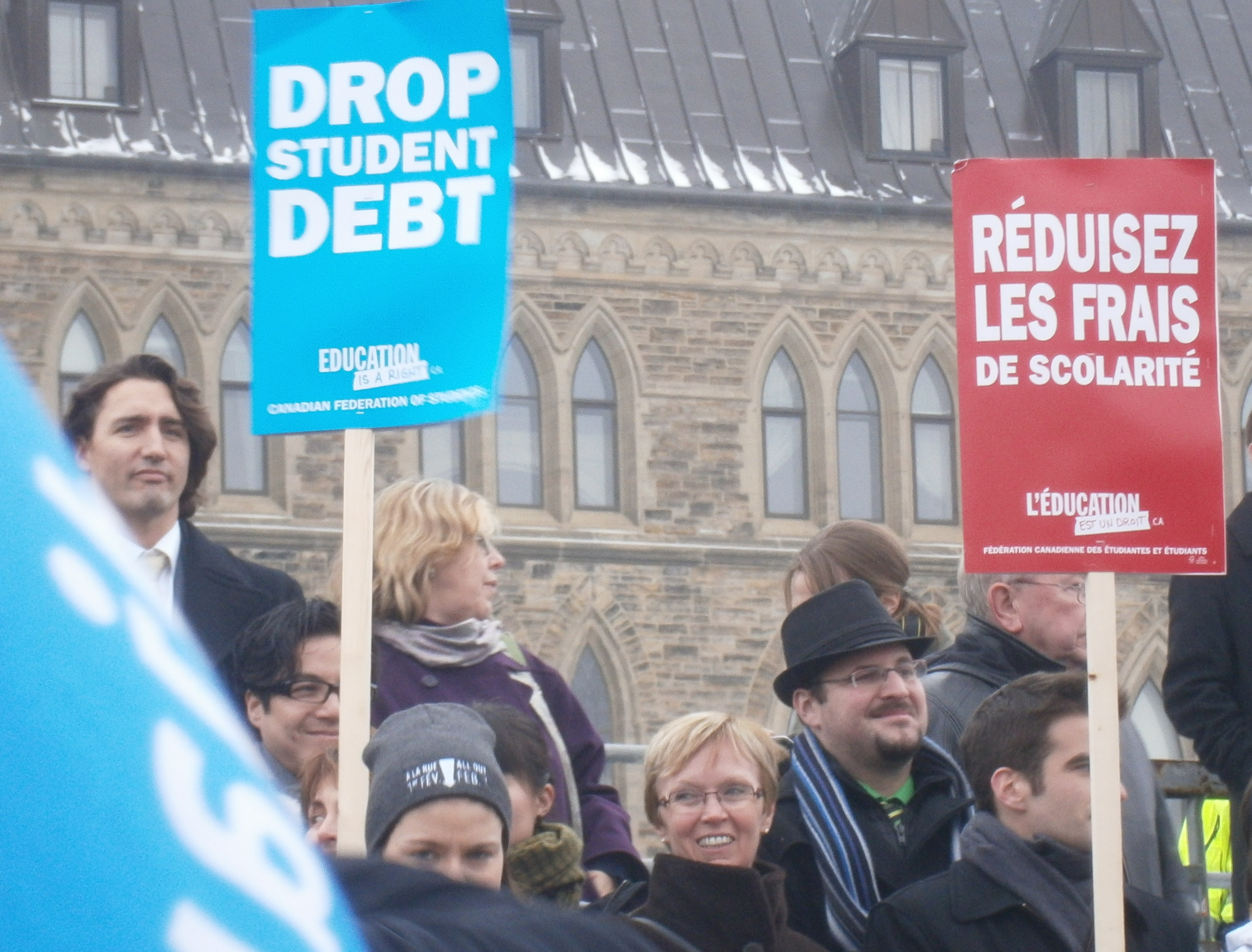
Trudeau at a demonstration in Ottawa against tuition fees, February 2012

Following the election, Trudeau said he was undecided about seeking the leadership; months later on October 12 at Wilfrid Laurier University, he announced he would not seek the post because he had a young family. When interim leader Bob Rae, who was also seen as a frontrunner, announced he would not be entering the race in June 2012, Trudeau was hit with a "tsunami" of calls from supporters to reconsider his earlier decision to not seek the leadership.

Opinion polling conducted by several pollsters showed that if Trudeau were to become leader the Liberal Party would surge in support, from a distant third place to either being competitive with the Conservative Party or leading them. In July 2012, Trudeau stated that he would reconsider his earlier decision to not seek the leadership and would announce his final decision at the end of the summer.

==== 2013 leadership election ====
On September 26, 2012, multiple media outlets started reporting that Trudeau would launch his leadership bid the following week. While Trudeau was seen as a frontrunner for the leadership of the Liberal Party, he was criticized for his perceived lack of substance. During his time as a member of Parliament, he spoke little on policy matters and it was not known where he stood on many issues such as the economy and foreign affairs. Some strategists and pundits believed the leadership would be the time for Trudeau to be tested on these issues; however, there was also fear within the party that his celebrity status and large lead might deter other strong candidates from entering the leadership race.

On October 2, 2012, Trudeau held a rally in Montreal to launch his bid for the leadership of the Liberal Party. The core members of his campaign team were longtime friends, all in their 30s and 40s. His senior advisor was Gerald Butts, the former president of WWF-Canada who had previously been principal secretary to former Ontario premier Dalton McGuinty. Other senior aides included campaign manager Katie Telford, and policy advisors Mike McNeir and Robert Asselin, who had all worked for recent Liberal Party leaders. His brother Alexandre also took a break from his documentary work to be a senior advisor on Trudeau's campaign.

During the leadership campaign, three by-elections were held on November 26, 2012. The riding Calgary Centre was expected to be a three-way race between the Conservatives, Liberals and Green Party. A week before by-election day Sun Media reported on comments Trudeau had made in a 2010 interview with Télé-Québec, in which he said, "Canada isn't doing well right now because it's Albertans who control our community and socio-democratic agenda." Trudeau's campaign advisor said that the comments were being brought up now because of the close race in Calgary Centre. The following day, Trudeau apologized, saying he was wrong to use "Alberta" as "shorthand" in referring to Stephen Harper's government. The Conservatives held onto Calgary Centre in the by-election by less than 1,200 votes. Liberal candidate Harvey Locke said he lost the by-election on his own and that comments made by Trudeau did not influence the outcome.

Fellow leadership candidate Marc Garneau, seen as Trudeau's main challenger in the race, criticized Trudeau for not releasing enough substantial policy positions. Garneau called on him to release more detailed policies before members and supporters begin to vote. Garneau later challenged Trudeau to a one-on-one debate, and said that if Trudeau could not defend his ideas in a debate against him, he wouldn't be able to do so against Prime Minister Harper. Trudeau clashed in debates with challenger Joyce Murray, who was the only Liberal leadership candidate to speak out strongly in favour of electing the House of Commons with a system of proportional representation. She challenged Trudeau over his support for a preferential ballot voting system.

On March 13, 2013, Garneau dropped out of the leadership race, saying that polling conducted by his campaign showed he would be unable to defeat Trudeau.

With Joyce Murray, the last challenger, receiving significant press time, more Liberal politicians and public figures declared themselves for Trudeau. Trudeau was declared the winner of the leadership election on April 14, 2013, garnering 80.1% of 30,800 votes. Joyce Murray finished in second place with 10.2%, ahead of Martha Hall Findlay's 5.7%. Trudeau had lost only five ridings, all to Murray and all in BC.

===== Early leadership (2013–2015) =====
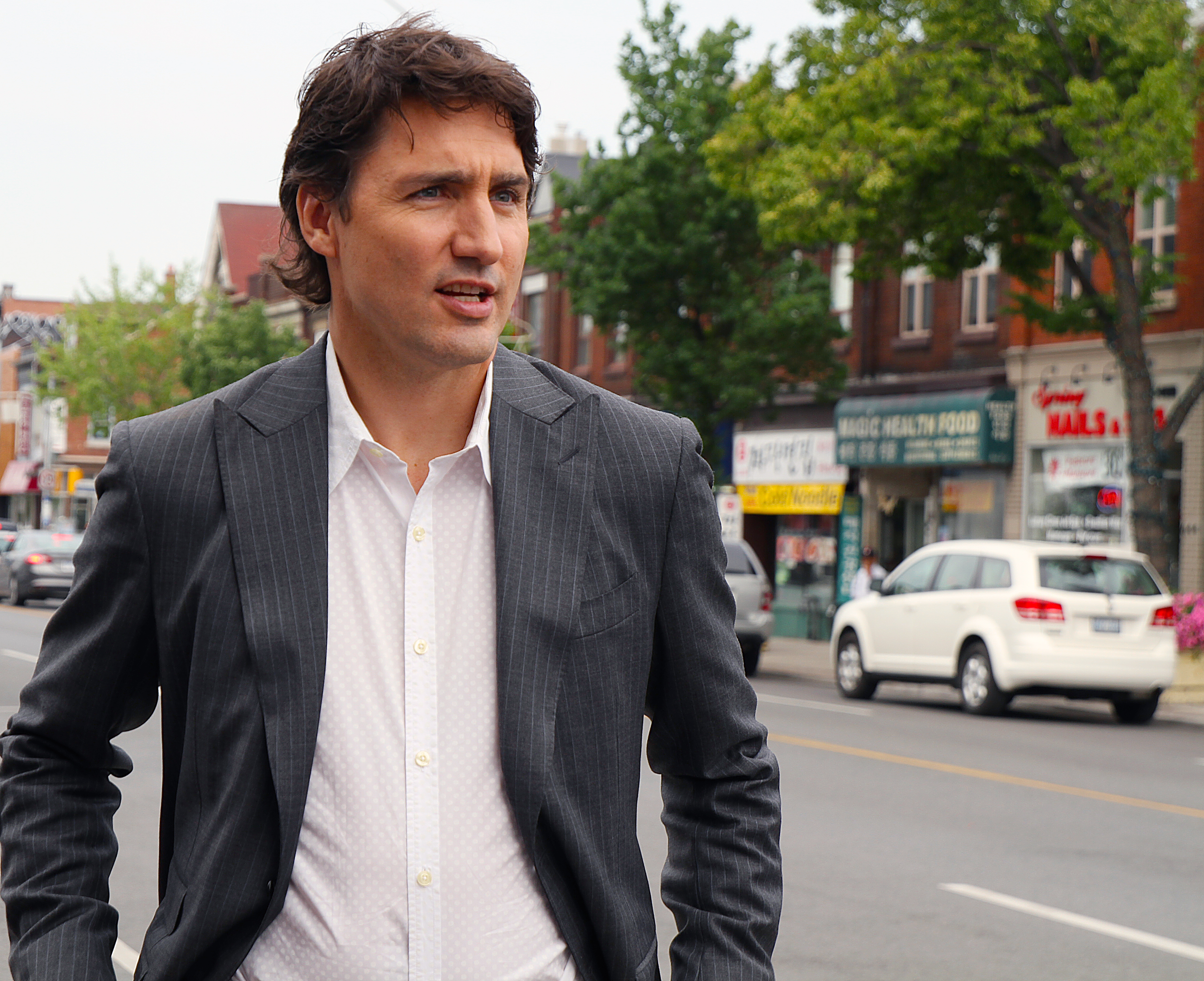
Trudeau campaigning in Toronto's Trinity—Spadina riding in support of Liberal candidate Adam Vaughan, June 2014

In the days following his victory in the leadership race, snapshot polls recorded a surge in support for the Liberal party.

In 2013, Trudeau chose to give up his seat at the funeral of Nelson Mandela, in deference to Irwin Cotler as representative of the Liberal Party of Canada, because of Cotler's work for and with Nelson Mandela in fighting apartheid.

During the leadership campaign, Trudeau pledged to park all his assets, exclusive of real estate holdings, into a blind trust which is atypical for opposition MPs, including leaders. According to documents obtained by the Ottawa Citizen, he fulfilled the pledge in July 2013 when the blind trust was set up by BMO Private Banking.

Trudeau launched an internet video the week before the 2014 Liberal party convention titled "An economy that benefits us all" in which he outlined his economic platform. He said that Canada's debt to GDP ratios have come down in recent years and now it's time for Ottawa to "step up".

==== 2015 federal election ====
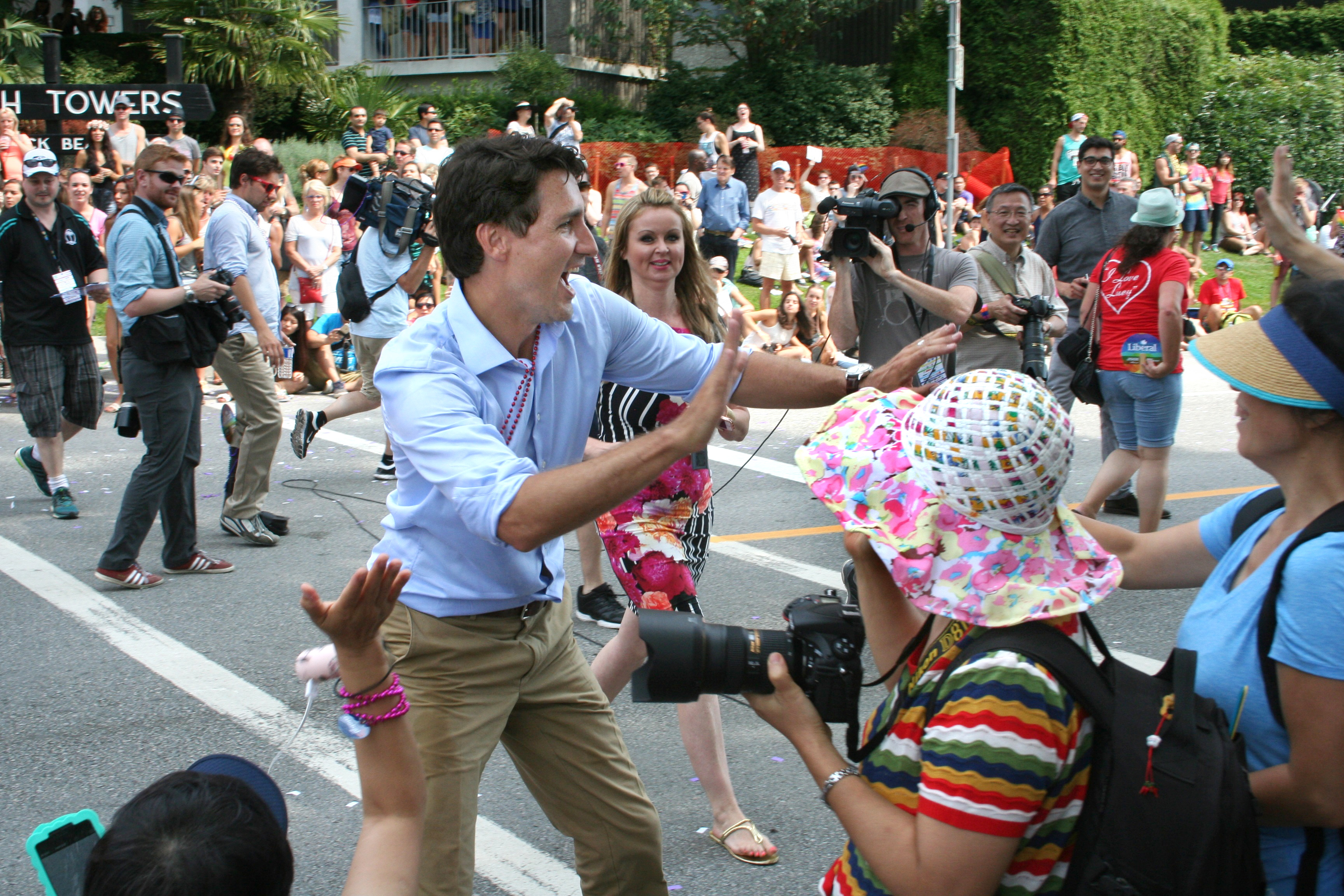
Trudeau at the Vancouver Pride Festival, shortly after launching his election campaign

On October 19, 2015, after the longest official campaign in over a century, Trudeau led the Liberals to a decisive victory in the federal election. The Liberals won 184 of the 338 seats, with 39.5% of the popular vote, for a strong majority government; a gain of 150 seats compared to the 2011 federal election.

This was the second-best performance in the party's history. The Liberals won mostly on the strength of a solid performance in the eastern half of the country. In addition to taking all of Atlantic Canada and Toronto, they won 40 seats in Quebec—the most that the Liberals had won in that province since Trudeau's father led them to a near-sweep of the province in 1980, and also the first time since then that the Liberals won a majority of Quebec's seats in an election. The 150-seat gain was the biggest numerical increase for a single party since Confederation and marked the first time that a party had rebounded from third place in the Commons to a majority government.

In addition to the appeal of his party's platform, Trudeau's success has been attributed to his stronger-than-expected performance, both on the campaign trail and in televised leaders' debates, after Conservative advertisements and conservative media outlets had lowered expectations.

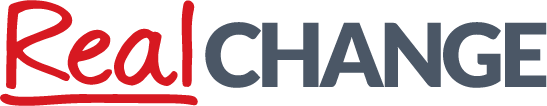
The Trudeau Liberals slogan during the 2015 campaign was "Real Change"

Trudeau declared victory shortly after CBC News projected that he had won a majority government. He began his speech with a reference to former Liberal prime minister Wilfrid Laurier's "sunny ways" (French: voies ensoleillées) approach to bringing Canadians together despite their differences. According to Trudeau, Laurier "knew that politics can be a positive force, and that's the message Canadians have sent today". Harper announced his resignation as the leader of the Conservative Party that night.

== Prime Minister of Canada (2015–2025) ==
=== Swearing-in ===
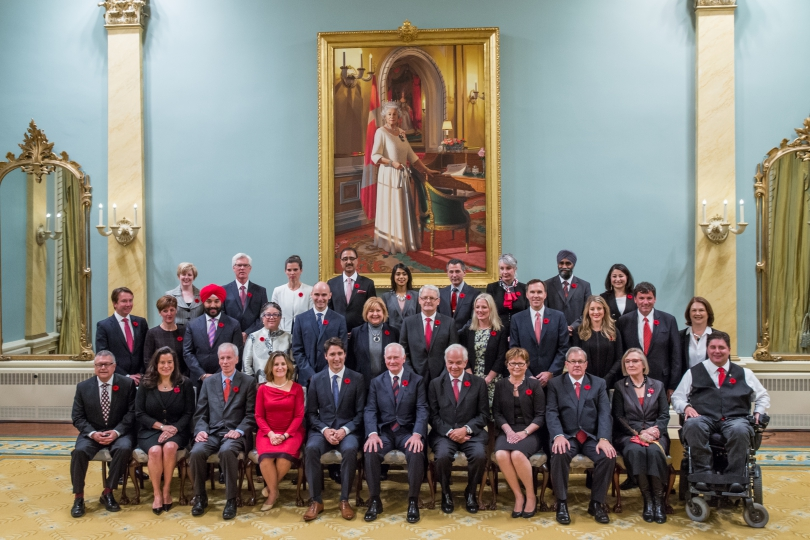
The 29th Canadian Ministry after being sworn into office, November 4, 2015

Trudeau and the rest of the Cabinet were sworn in by Governor General David Johnston on November 4, 2015. He said that his first legislative priority was to lower taxes for middle-income Canadians and raise taxes for the top 1% of income earners after parliament was reconvened on December 3, 2015. Trudeau also issued a statement promising to rebuild relations with Indigenous peoples in Canada and run an open, ethical and transparent government.

=== Domestic policy ===
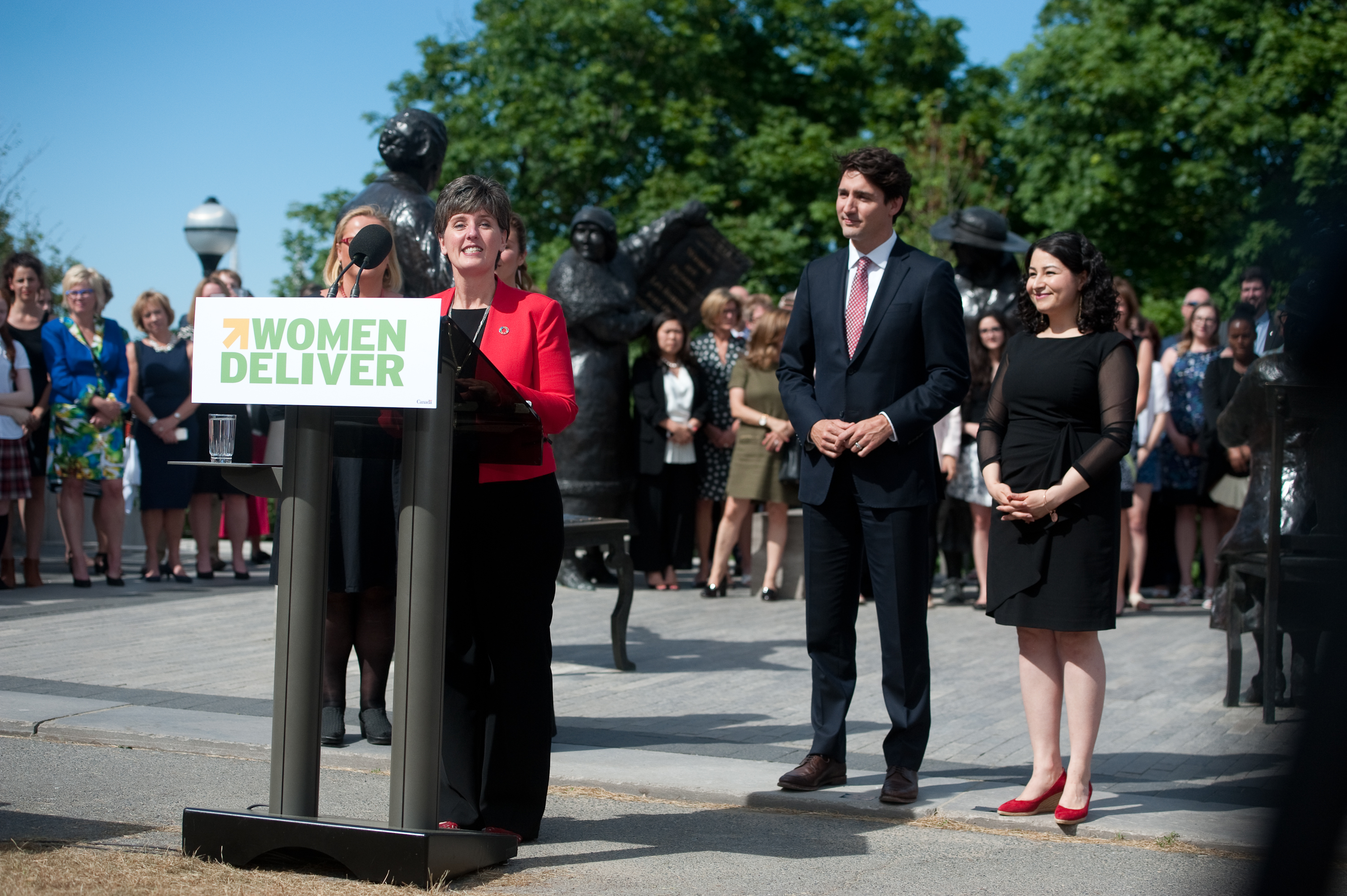
Trudeau with Maryam Monsef and Marie-Claude Bibeau at the 2019 Women Deliver event in Vancouver.

The Trudeau government's economic policy initially relied on increased tax revenues to pay for increased government spending. In 2016, it announced the creation of the Canada Child Benefit and an expansion of the Canada Pension Plan. While Trudeau's government never balanced the budget, it reduced Canada's debt-to-GDP ratio every year until 2020, when the COVID-19 pandemic hit. Trudeau's self-described progressive and feminist social policy has included strong advocacy for abortion rights. His government introduced the bill which made conversion therapies illegal in Canada. Canada introduced the right to medically-assisted dying in 2016, and legalized cannabis for recreational use in 2018. In 2021, Trudeau announced the creation of a national child care plan with the intention of reducing day care fees for parents down to $10 a day per child within five years. In 2024, his government announced the creation of a national school food program.

His environmental policy included introducing new commitments to reduce greenhouse gas emissions by 30% before 2030 and achieve net-zero emissions by 2050. His main tool for reaching this target is a federal carbon pricing policy. Trudeau's parliament also adopted legislation for marine conservation, banning six common single-use plastic products, and strengthening environmental impact assessments. Trudeau pledged in 2019 to ban single-use plastics. In 2022, his government announced a ban on producing and importing single-use plastics beginning in December 2022. The announced restrictions were scheduled to extend to sales in December 2023 and exports in 2025. However, Trudeau is in favour of oil and gas pipelines to bring Canadian fossil fuel resources to foreign markets.

Before winning the 2015 election, Trudeau promised to accept 50,000 refugees from Syria and Iraq by the end of 2016. In 2016, Trudeau's advisors recommended drastically increasing immigration levels to stimulate the economy. Despite warnings about the impact of rapid population growth on housing and services, Trudeau's government increased targets each year, reaching almost 1 million newcomers (permanent and temporary residents) in both 2022 and 2023. In November 2022, the Trudeau government announced that Canada would admit 500,000 immigrants per year by 2025. Trudeau initiated measures to combat housing inflation such as banning foreign buyers and creating the Housing Accelerator Fund, but asserted in a May 2024 interview that "housing needs to retain its value". In October 2024, as Canadians endured cost of living and housing crises, and as Trudeau's unpopularity grew, he announced cuts to immigration targets in a video message. This had little effect on Trudeau's approval rating, however, which had plummeted from 65% in 2016 to 22% in December 2024. In 2024, food bank use reached an all-time high, with more working people than ever using food banks amid global food crises. Reports released in early 2025 suggested that population growth would not be significantly slowed even with the Trudeau government's proposed cuts.

On September 22, 2023, Yaroslav Hunka, a Ukrainian Canadian who fought in the SS Division Galicia of the military wing of the Nazi Party, the Waffen-SS, was invited to the House of Commons of Canada to be recognized by Speaker Anthony Rota, the Member of Parliament for Hunka's district. Hunka received two standing ovations from all house members, including Justin Trudeau, other party leaders, and visiting Ukrainian president Volodymyr Zelenskyy. The incident, seen as a political blunder and a scandal that drew comparisons to the most embarrassing moments in Canada's history, was leveraged by the Russian establishment to further its justifications for the 2022 Russian invasion of Ukraine. Trudeau said, "this is a mistake that deeply embarrassed parliament and Canada", and apologized to President Zelenskyy.

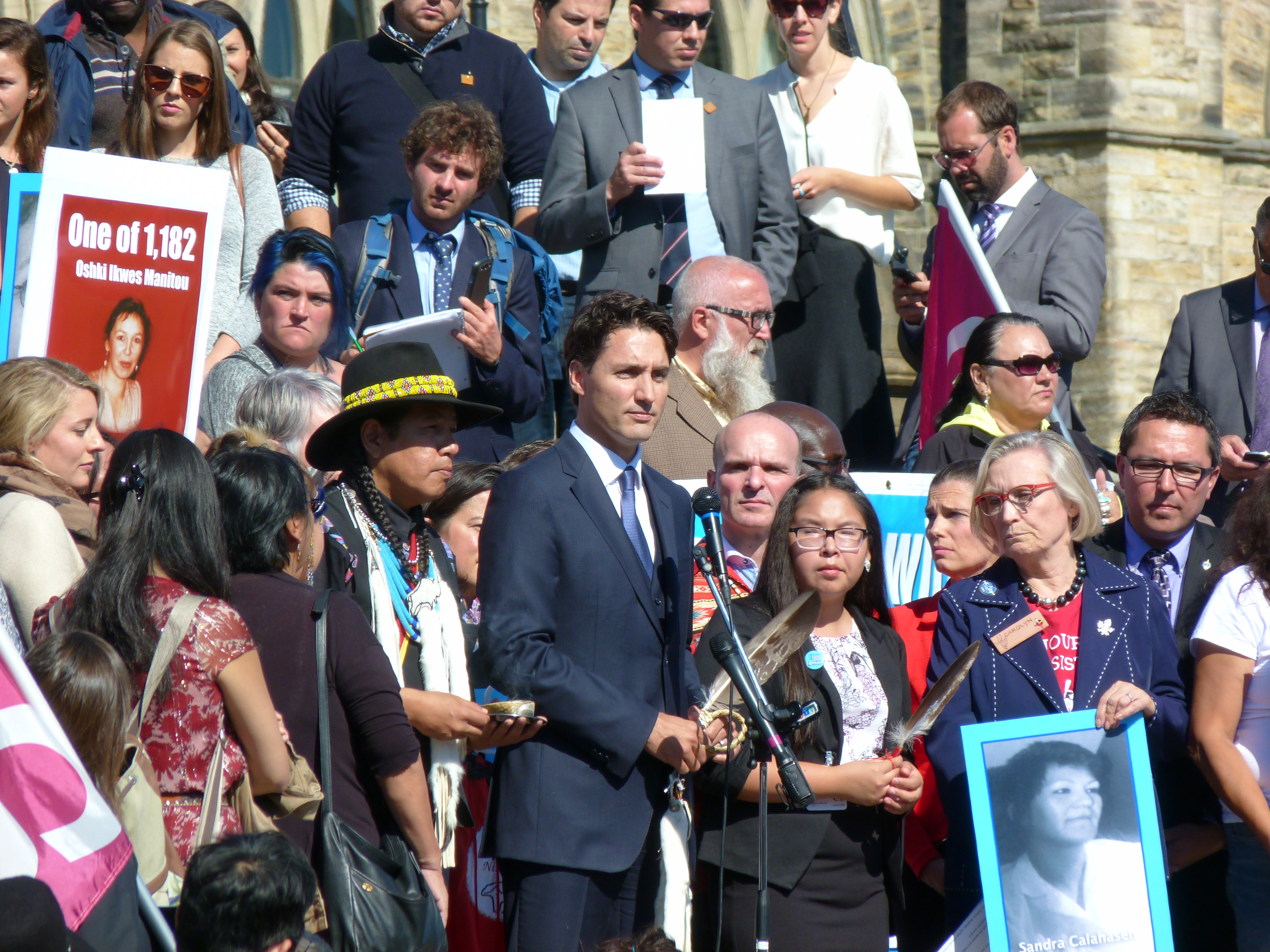
Trudeau giving a speech on the issue of missing and murdered Indigenous women, October 2016

As prime minister, Trudeau launched three major independent investigations: the National Inquiry into Missing and Murdered Indigenous Women (MMIWG), the Joint Federal/Provincial Commission into the 2020 Nova Scotia attacks (in partnership with the Government of Nova Scotia), and the Public Inquiry into Foreign Interference in Federal Electoral Processes and Democratic Institutions. The latter was called in response to allegations of Chinese government interference in the 2019 and 2021 Canadian federal elections, but also deals with interference from other states deemed hostile to Canada. The MMIWG investigation found that Canada's response to this issue amounts to genocide, a finding Trudeau said he accepted.

Trudeau chose the following jurists to be appointed as justices of the Supreme Court of Canada: Richard Wagner (as chief justice), Malcolm Rowe, Sheilah Martin, Nicholas Kasirer, Mahmud Jamal, Michelle O'Bonsawin, and Mary Moreau. His appointees included the court's first justice from a visible minority and its first Indigenous justice.

==== COVID-19 pandemic ====
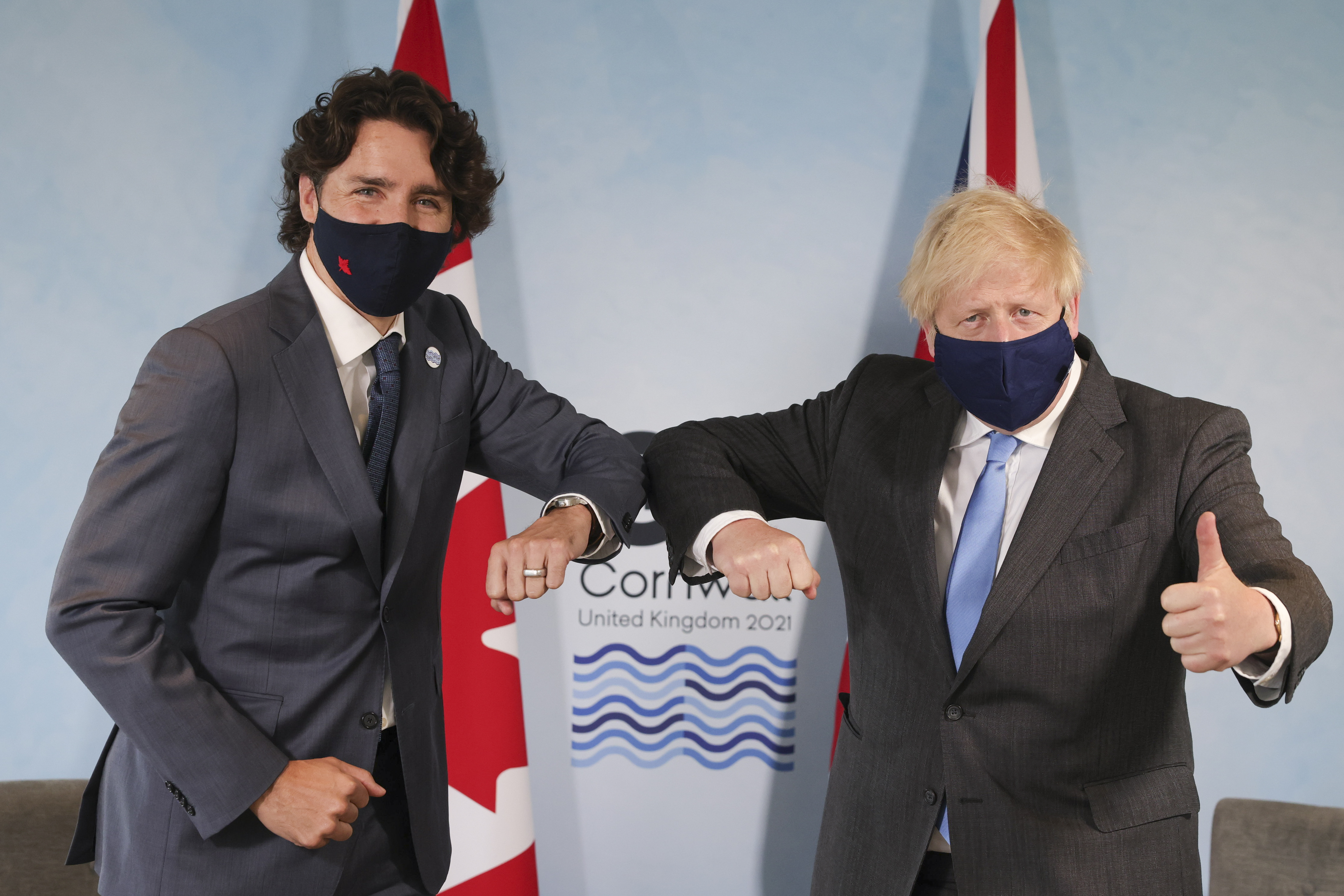
Trudeau and British Prime Minister Boris Johnson elbow bump while wearing face masks as a COVID-19 precaution during the 47th G7 summit, June 2021

Trudeau was prime minister during the worldwide COVID-19 pandemic. His government's response to the pandemic included funds for provinces and territories to adapt to the new situation, funds for coronavirus research, travel restrictions, screening of international flights, self-isolation orders under the Quarantine Act, an industrial strategy, and a public health awareness campaign. Initially, Canada faced a shortage of personal protective equipment, as the Trudeau government had cut PPE stockpile funding in the previous years.

To deal with the economic impact of the pandemic in 2020, Trudeau waived student loan payments, increased the Canada Child Benefit, doubled the annual Goods and Services Tax payment, and introduced the Canada Emergency Response Benefit (CERB) as part of a first package in March. In April 2020, Trudeau introduced the Canada Emergency Wage Subsidy, the Canada Emergency Business Account, and the Canada Emergency Student Benefit. Trudeau also deployed the Canadian Forces in long-term care homes in Quebec and Ontario as part of Operation LASER.

Throughout the pandemic, the federal government was also responsible for the procurement of COVID-19 vaccines. On May 12, 2020, the Trudeau government announced it had reached an exclusive deal with CanSino Biologics. However, due to deteriorating Canadian-Chinese relations, the CanSino deal fell through. On August 5, 2020, the Trudeau government created a plan to secure doses of the Pfizer and Moderna vaccines. Starting in December 2020, Trudeau oversaw the implementation of Canada's mass-vaccination program.

The spread of COVID-19 in Canada continued beyond the initial outbreak, with a strong second wave in the fall of 2020 and an even more serious third wave in the spring of 2021. Throughout the crisis, Trudeau periodically extended the scope and duration of the federal aid programs. The 2021 Canadian federal budget planned to phase them out by the end of September 2021, and projected a $354.2-billion deficit in the 2020–21 fiscal year. While CERB was indeed phased out on September 26, the Canada Recovery Benefit (CRB) continued to provide support until October 23. The Canada Worker Lockdown Benefit was introduced that month to replace the CRB, and expanded during the spread of the Omicron variant in December 2021.

==== Freedom Convoy and Emergencies Act invocation ====
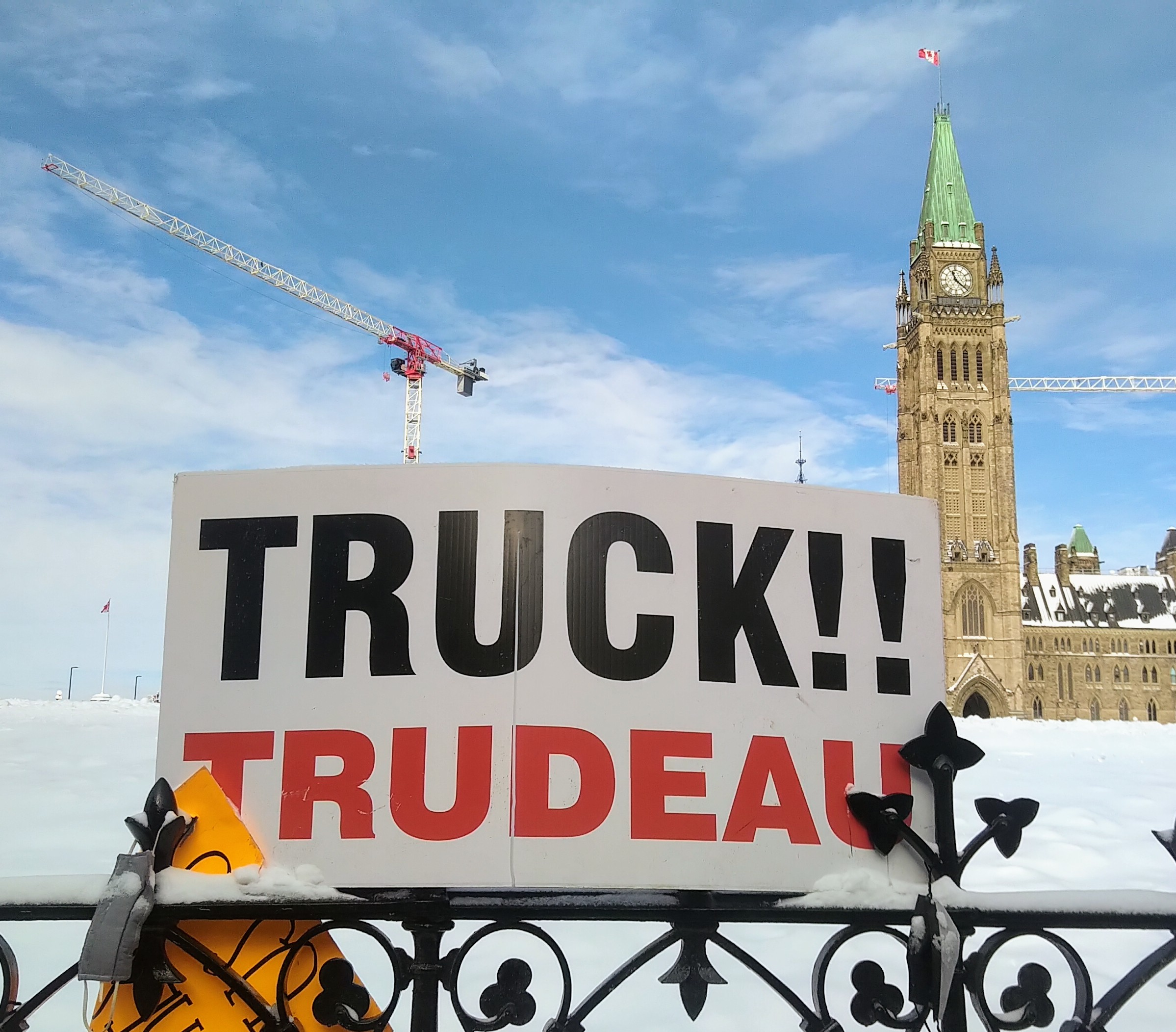
A protest sign on Parliament Hills fence during the Canadian truckers convoy protest, January 2022

The Canada convoy protest, called the Freedom Convoy, was a protest in Canada against COVID-19 vaccine requirements for truckers to re-enter the country by land introduced by the Government of Canada on January 15, 2022. The truck convoys travelled along several routes through all the Canadian provinces before converging on Ottawa.

On January 29, the first day of protest at Parliament Hill, Trudeau moved to an undisclosed location. According to The Guardian, the demonstration developed to express a number of "antigovernment grievances", particularly against Trudeau. On January 31, Trudeau called the protests an "insult to truth". On February 3, he said that a military response was "not in the cards right now". On February 11, Reuters reported that Trudeau promised the US "quick action" regarding protesters who had blocked the Ambassador Bridge on the US-Canada border, the continent's "busiest land border crossing". Trudeau subsequently indicated that there would be "robust police intervention" and called for all protesters to "go home".

Trudeau invoked the Emergencies Act on February 14, 2022, for the first time since it was enacted in 1988, as a result of the public order emergency caused by the demonstrations in Ottawa. On February 23, 2022, Trudeau announced that the federal government would revoke the emergency declaration. Later that day, the governor general signed a proclamation revoking it. A year later, on February 17, 2023, a judicial inquiry into the use of the Emergencies Act concluded that the Trudeau government met the legal threshold required to invoke the act. In early 2024, Federal Court judge Richard Mosley ruled that the federal government's invocation of the Emergencies Act to end the 2022 convoy protest was "not justified" and infringed on Charter rights. The federal government lost its appeal of the ruling in January 2026.

==== 2019 federal election ====
On September 11, 2019, Trudeau visited Governor General Julie Payette to request the dissolution of Parliament, formally triggering an election. Prior to the formal start of the campaign, Trudeau announced his intention to only participate in the three leaders' debates, two organized by the Leaders' Debates Commission, and one organized by TVA. Other leaders' debates were either cancelled or took place with an empty podium left on stage for Trudeau.

In September 2019, controversial pictures and video were published showing Trudeau in brownface and blackface. On September 18, 2019, Time magazine published a photograph of Trudeau wearing brownface makeup in the spring of 2001, at an Arabian Nights-themed gala, while Trudeau was a teacher at West Point Grey Academy. Trudeau publicly apologized, agreeing the photo was racist and saying: "I shouldn't have done that. I should have known better and I didn't. I'm really sorry." He further went on to say "It was something that I didn't think was racist at the time, but now I recognize it was something racist to do". Trudeau also admitted to wearing blackface makeup while singing "Day-O" at a high-school talent show; the incident was subsequently reported by Global News. A third instance, a video, of Trudeau in racist dress was also published. After this video was published, Trudeau admitted he could not remember how often he had worn blackface makeup. In the days following the scandal, pollsters pointed out that many Canadians either were not bothered by the scandal or had accepted Trudeau's apology. Additionally, some minority community groups, racialized commentators and some of Trudeau's opponents came to his defence. Others were more critical, including members of his own party.

While Trudeau's Liberal Party lost 20 seats in the House of Commons (lowering its total from 177 to 157) from the time of dissolution, they still won the most seats of any party—enough to allow Trudeau to form a minority government. For the first time since 1979, the party that garnered the largest share of the national popular vote did not win the most seats; the Liberals under Trudeau had 33.1% of the popular vote, while the Conservatives under Andrew Scheer had 34.4%.

==== 2021 federal election ====
On August 15, 2021, Trudeau advised Governor General Mary Simon to dissolve Parliament, scheduling an election for September 20. The election was called on the same day as the Fall of Kabul. In the first two weeks of the campaign, Trudeau received criticism for not acting fast enough in the face of the 2021 Taliban offensive to evacuate Canadian citizens and Afghans who supported Canada's military and diplomatic efforts during the War in Afghanistan. The Liberals called the election to win a majority government and govern alone.

In the 2021 federal election, Trudeau secured a third mandate and his second minority government after winning 160 seats. However, the Liberals came in second in the national popular vote, behind the Conservatives. They received 32.6% of the popular vote, the lowest percentage of the national popular vote for a governing party in Canadian history. The results were mostly unchanged from the 2019 federal election.

===== Confidence and supply agreement =====
On March 22, 2022, the Liberals and the NDP entered a supply and confidence agreement, in which the NDP committed to supporting the Liberals in all votes of confidence for the duration of the 44th Parliament. In exchange, the Liberal Party would back key NDP priorities, including national dental care for low-income Canadians, national pharmacare, labour reforms for federally regulated workers, and new taxes on financial institutions.

In September 2024, the NDP pulled their support and ended the supply and confidence agreement. The Conservative Party made three failed no-confidence motions in September, October, and December, none of which received NDP support. On December 20, 2024, NDP leader Jagmeet Singh pledged to put forward another no-confidence motion and vote out Trudeau's government.

=== Foreign policy ===
In 2015, Trudeau told the New York Times Magazine that Canada could be the "first postnational state".

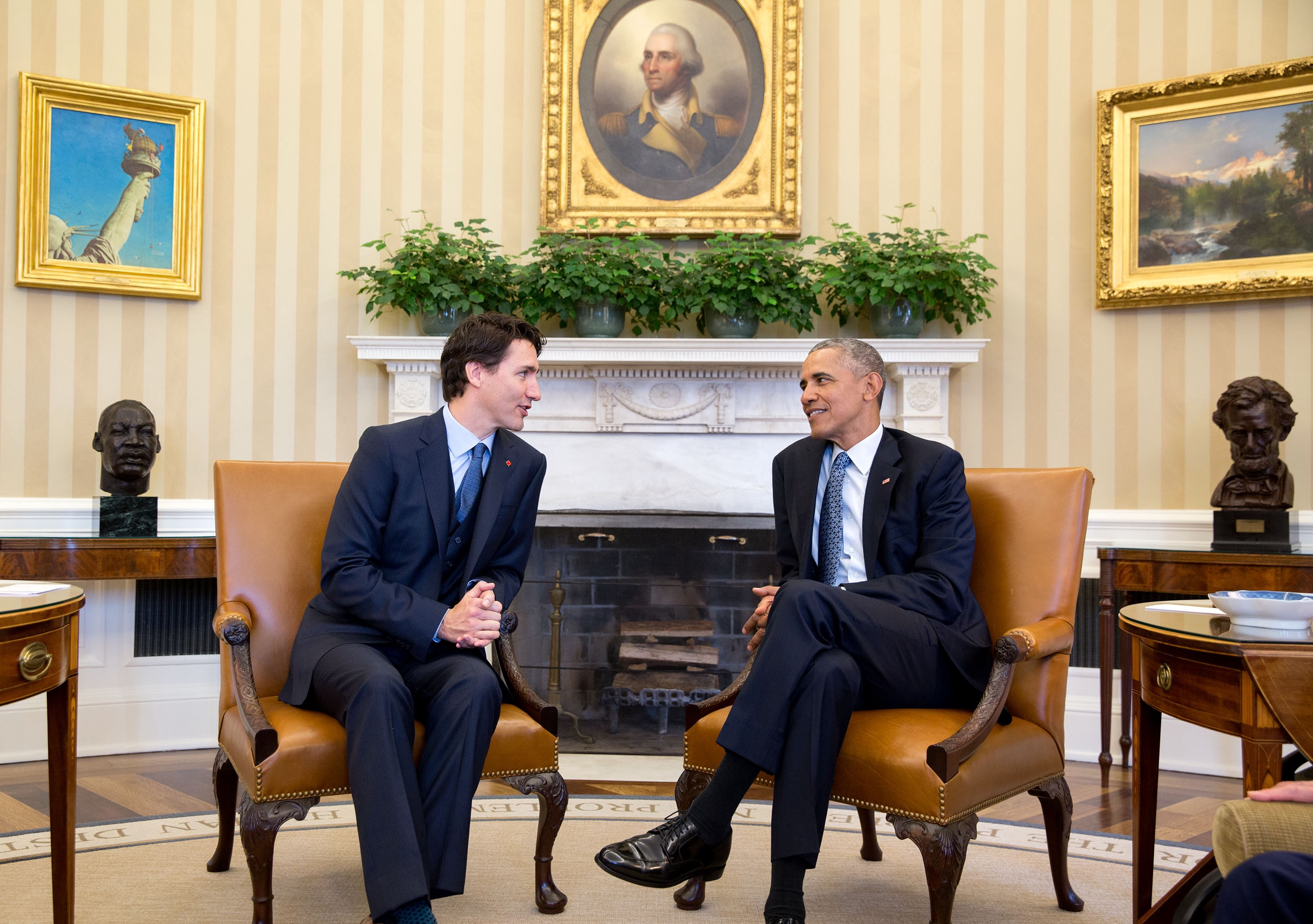
Trudeau speaking with U.S. president Barack Obama in the White House's Oval Office, 2016

Trudeau enjoyed good relations with the "like-minded" United States president Barack Obama, despite Trudeau's support for the Keystone Pipeline, which was rejected by the Democratic president. Trudeau's first foreign policy challenges included follow-through on his campaign promise to withdraw Canadian air support from the Syrian civil war and to welcome 25,000 Syrian war refugees.

In 2016, Trudeau lifted visa requirements for Mexican citizens. Asylum claims by Mexicans grew from 110 in 2015 to 24,000 in 2023. Visas and some restrictions were reinstated in 2024.

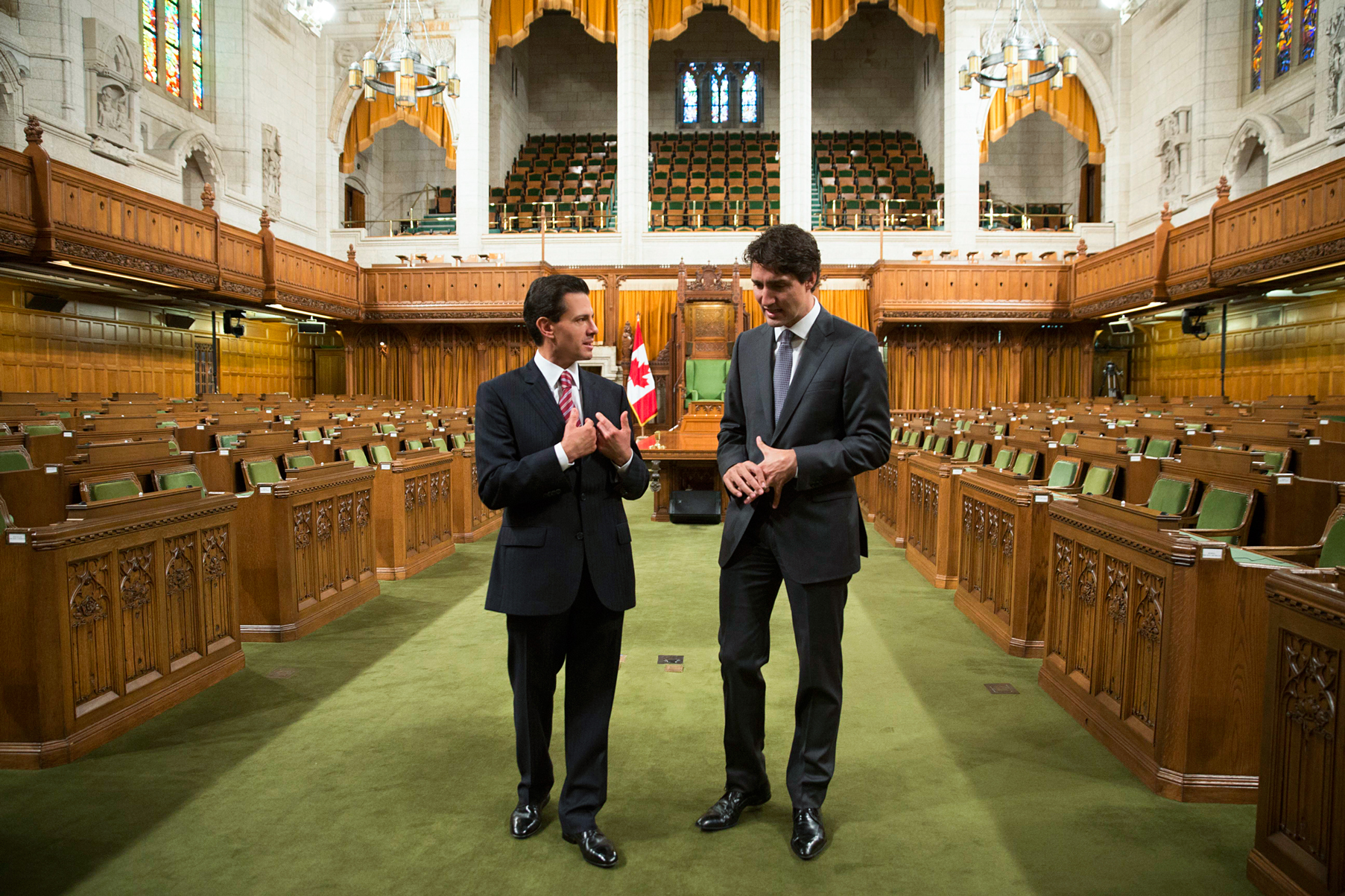
Trudeau with Mexican president Enrique Peña Nieto at Parliament Hill, 2016

In January 2017, Trudeau wrote, "To those fleeing persecution, terror & war, Canadians will welcome you, regardless of your faith. Diversity is our strength #WelcomeToCanada," on Twitter. As a result, irregular border crossings increased, mainly at Roxham Road. Increased strain on services in Quebec and Ontario, and criticism over the unsustainable influx of claimants, appeared to influence the decision to close Roxham Road in March 2023; however, the new terms of the Canada–United States Safe Third Country Agreement (STCA) had been arranged the previous year. After irregular border crossings were shut down, asylum claims surged at airports.

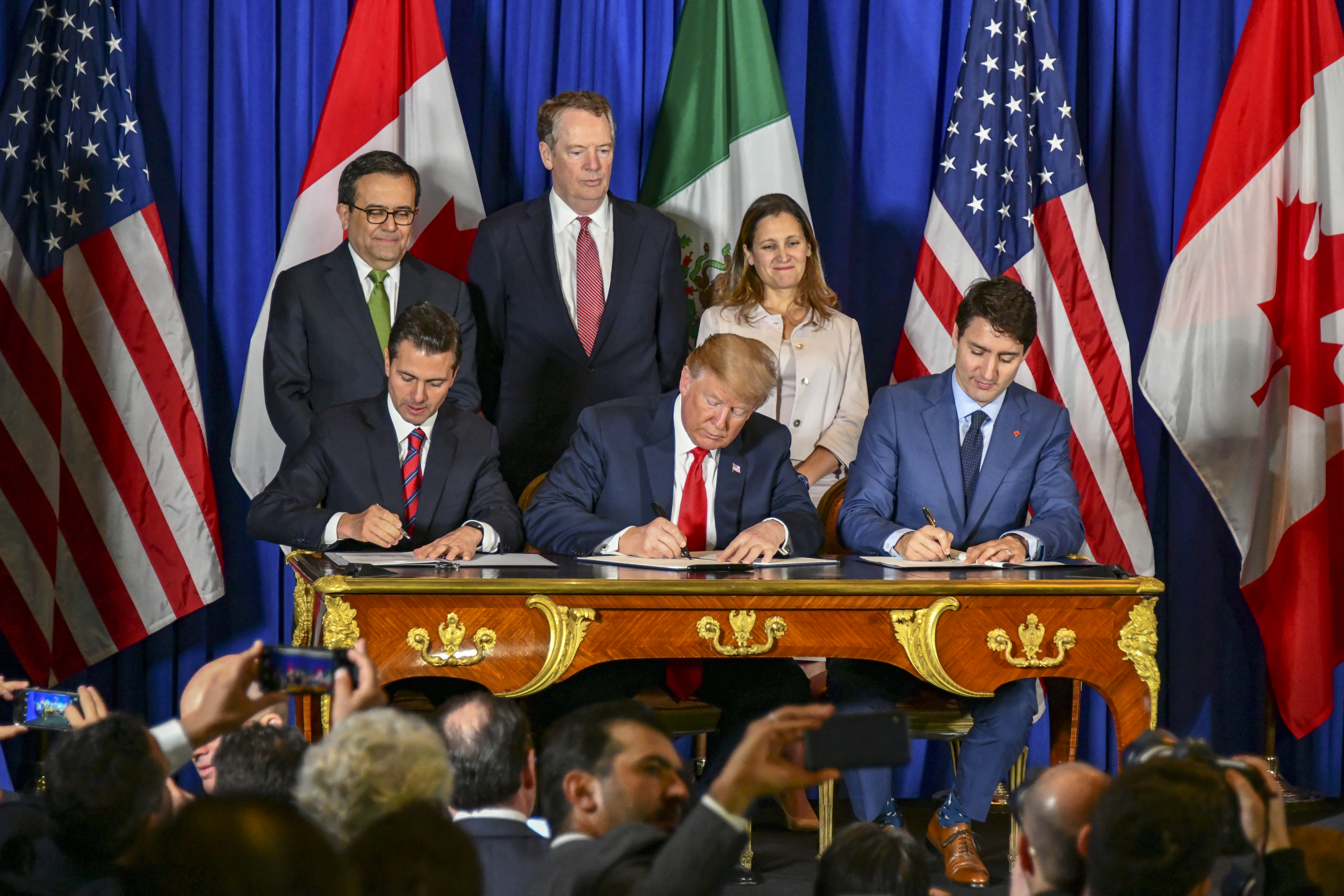
Trudeau signing CUSMA alongside US president Donald Trump and Mexican president Enrique Peña Nieto, 2018.

When Donald Trump became president in 2017, Canada-US relations deteriorated. The Trump administration forced the renegotiation of NAFTA to create the CUSMA, in which Canada made significant concessions in allowing increased imports of American milk, weakening Canada's dairy supply management system. Donald Trump also implemented tariffs on Canadian steel and aluminum, to which Trudeau retaliated by imposing tariffs on American steel, aluminum and a variety of other American products.

Canada's relationship with China also deteriorated during Trudeau's time as prime minister. The turmoil led to the arrest of Meng Wanzhou at the Vancouver International Airport in December 2018 at the behest of the United States, and the arrest of Michael Spavor and Michael Kovrig in China 12 days later. Trudeau appointed Liberal advisor Dominic Barton (associated with McKinsey & Company and the Century Initiative) as ambassador to China in 2019. While Barton negotiated the release of Spavor and Kovrig, Canada-China trade reached historic highs. Barton resigned in December 2021, "amidst growing pressure from...President Joe Biden for Ottawa to take a tougher stance with Beijing." As Wanzhou, Spavor and Kovrig were released at the exact same time in September 2021, many observers speculated they were exchanged as part of a deal between the United States and China. Trudeau greeted Spavor and Kovrig at the airport upon their repatriation. In 2024, Spavor was awarded $7 million in compensation for his arrest and detainment. Although Trudeau repeatedly claimed the two were arbitrarily targeted, it was later reported Spavor had unwittingly participated in espionage by sharing information on North Korea with Kovrig, who then passed it on to the Canadian government.

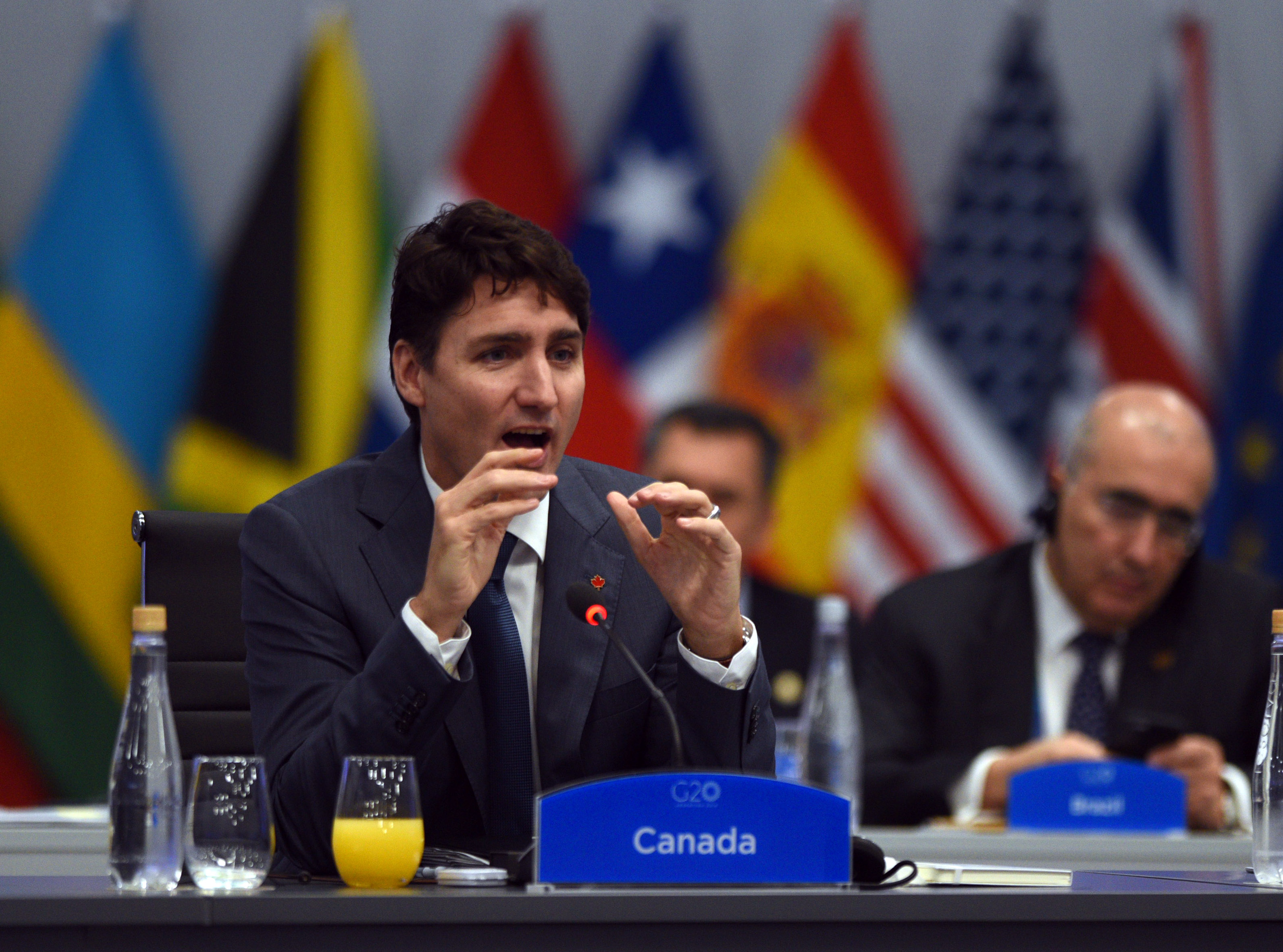
Trudeau speaking during the second day of the 2018 G20 Buenos Aires summit

In a similar fashion, Canada's relationship with Saudi Arabia was also put under strain, as human rights groups called on Trudeau to stop selling military equipment to that country under a deal struck by the Harper government. In 2018, Saudi Arabia recalled its Canadian ambassador and froze trade with the country in response to Canada's call for the Saudis to release opposition blogger Raif Badawi. However, in 2019, Canada doubled its weapons sales to Saudi Arabia, despite a "moratorium on export permits following the killing of the Saudi journalist Jamal Khashoggi and mounting civilian deaths from the Saudi Arabian-led intervention in Yemen."

In 2020, Canada lost its bid to join the United Nations Security Council. It was Canada's second unsuccessful bid for a Security Council seat, following an earlier bid in 2009 under Prime Minister Stephen Harper.

In September 2023, Trudeau said that the government of Canada had "credible intelligence" that the government of India was involved in the killing of a Canadian citizen, Hardeep Singh Nijjar, outside a Sikh gurdwara in Surrey. This episode triggered the Canada–India diplomatic row.

On October 7, 2023, Trudeau condemned the Hamas-led surprise attack on Israel, which devolved into the Gaza war, and expressed his support for Israel and its right to self-defence. On October 24, he rejected calls for a ceasefire but said he supported "humanitarian pauses" to deliver aid to the people of the Gaza Strip. On December 12, in a joint statement with the Prime Minister of Australia and the Prime Minister of New Zealand, Trudeau called for a "sustainable ceasefire" in the war. Trudeau neither endorsed nor rejected South Africa's genocide case against Israel.

Trudeau announces the Government of Canada's response to U.S. tariffs, 2025

Following Donald Trump's second inauguration in January 2025, Canada-US relations again deteriorated. On March 4, 2025, President Trump imposed 25% tariffs on Canadian exports, 10% tariffs on Canadian energy products, with an exemption for the automotive industry set to expire on April 2. In retaliation, Trudeau announced countermeasures, with Canada imposing 25% tariffs on $30 billion worth of U.S. goods, effective March 5, 2025. These retaliatory tariffs were set to increase to $155 billion worth of U.S. products within 21 days and would remain in place until the U.S. trade actions were withdrawn.

On March 8, while giving a speech at the National Forum on Combatting Antisemitism, Trudeau identified himself as a Zionist.

==== Foreign interference ====
In 2022 and 2023, Canadian media reported that the People's Republic of China had made attempts to interfere in the 2019 Canadian federal election and 2021 Canadian federal election.

Canadian opposition parties demanded a public inquiry into election interference. Rejecting a full public inquiry, Trudeau nominated former Governor General of Canada David Johnston to investigate the allegations. Johnston delivered a report in May 2023, which described China's interference as a danger to Canadian democracy, stated that some of the media reports were partially incorrect, and that the Canadian intelligence services and Canadian government needed to make several improvements to counter the threat and protect members of Parliament.

Following Johnston's resignation on June 9, Justin Trudeau commissioned Québec justice Marie-Josée Hogue to preside over the Public Inquiry into Foreign Interference in Federal Electoral Processes and Democratic Institutions. In May 2024, the inquiry issued its preliminary report, finding that China engaged in foreign interference in both elections, but the interference did not affect the ultimate result of either election.

=== Ethics ===
Trudeau was criticized by opposition members in November 2016 for his fundraising tactics, which they saw as "cash for access" schemes. Trudeau attended fundraisers where attendees paid upwards of $1,500 for access to him and other cabinet members. In some instances, the events were attended by foreign businessmen who needed government approval for their businesses. Trudeau defended his fundraising tactics, saying that they were not in breach of any ethics rules. He also stated that he was lobbied at the fundraisers but not influenced. In 2017, Trudeau introduced legislation that would eliminate such exclusive events by requiring increased transparency for political fundraisers.

In January 2017, the ethics commissioner, Mary Dawson, began an investigation into Trudeau for a vacation he and his family took to Aga Khan IV's private island in the Bahamas. The ethics commissioner's report, released in December 2017, found that Trudeau had violated four provisions of the 2006 Conflict of Interest Act. He became the first prime minister to break the modern federal conflict of interest law. In 2022, it was reported that the Royal Canadian Mounted Police had considered bringing criminal charges against Trudeau over the affair.

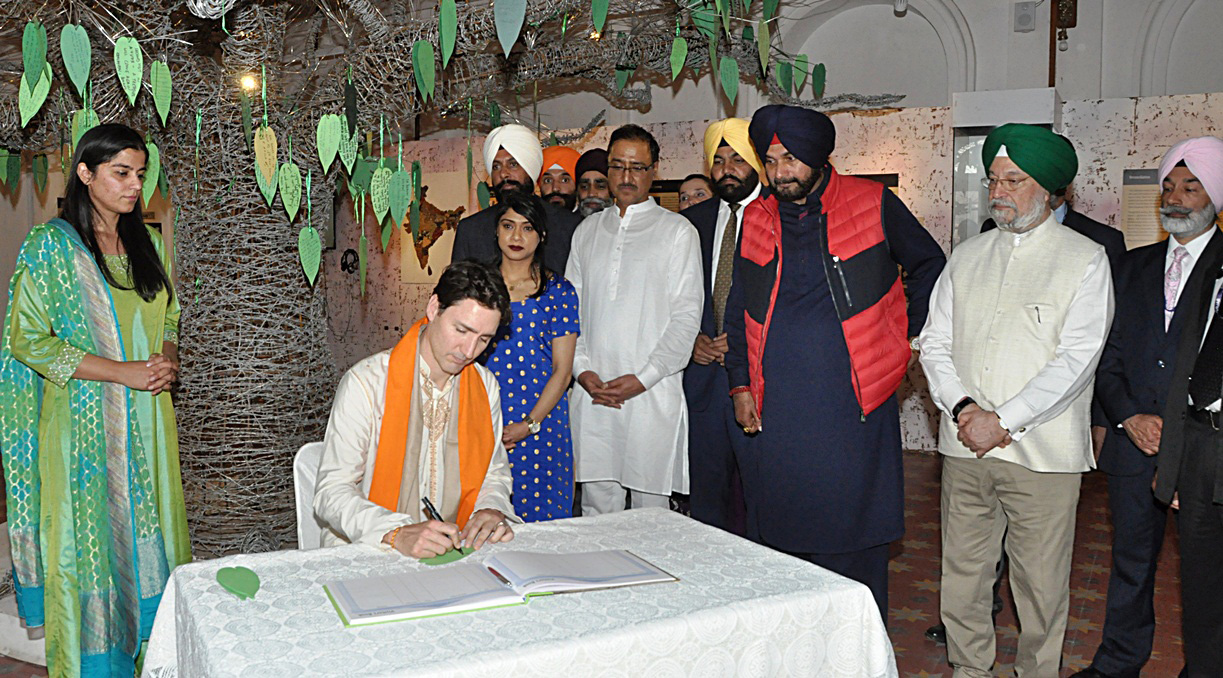
Trudeau signs a guestbook at the Golden Temple in Amritsar, India, in 2018.

In February 2018, Trudeau was criticized when his government invited Khalistani nationalist Jaspal Atwal to the Canadian High Commission's dinner party in Delhi. Atwal had previously been convicted for the shooting and attempted murder of Indian Cabinet minister Malkiat Singh Sidhu in 1986, as well as the assault on former BC premier Ujjal Dosanjh in 1985. Following the dinner, the PMO rescinded the invitation and apologized for the incident.

==== SNC-Lavalin affair ====
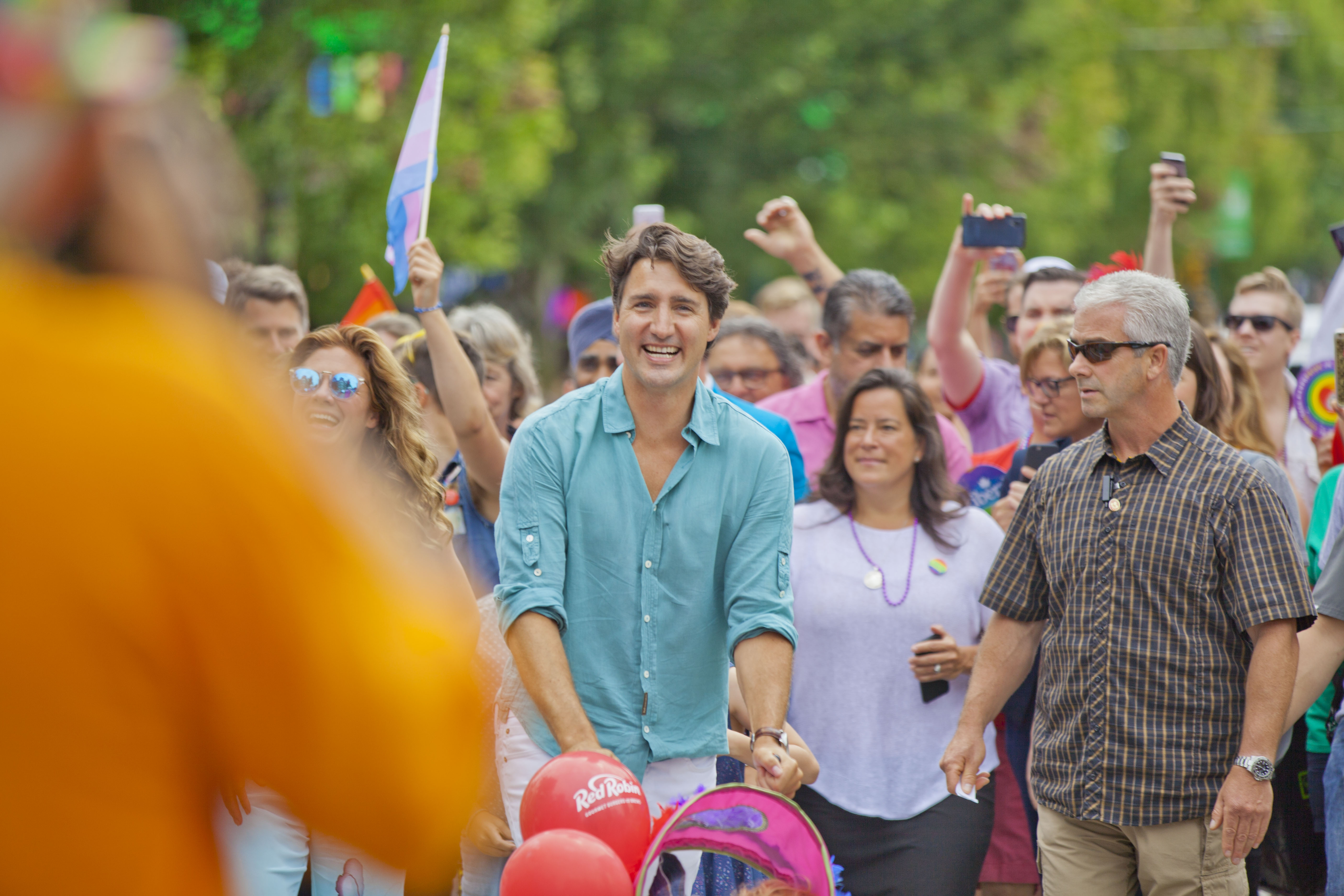
Trudeau at the 2018 Vancouver Pride Parade, accompanied by then-Minister of Justice and Attorney General Jody Wilson-Raybould, who would later be central to the SNC-Lavalin affair in 2019.

On February 8, 2019, The Globe and Mail reported that sources close to the government said that the Prime Minister's Office had allegedly attempted to influence Attorney General Jody Wilson-Raybould concerning ongoing prosecution of engineering and construction firm SNC-Lavalin. The charges alleged that between 2001 and 2011, SNC-Lavalin had paid CA$48 million in bribes in Libya to officials in the government of Muammar Gaddafi. When asked about the allegations, Trudeau said that the story in the Globe was false and that he had never "directed" Wilson-Raybould concerning the case. Wilson-Raybould did not comment on the matter, citing solicitor-client privilege. Soon after, Trudeau voluntarily waived privilege and cabinet confidences, permitting her to speak.

On February 11, Mario Dion, the Ethics Commissioner, announced the opening of an investigation into the allegations. Trudeau said he "welcomed the investigation". The Justice Committee of the House of Commons conducted a series of hearings on the alleged interference. The investigation heard from several witnesses, including Wilson-Raybould, who submitted as evidence a telephone call she secretly recorded between herself and Privy Council Clerk Michael Wernick, which was subsequently released to the public. On the recording, Wernick is heard asking to understand why the "DPA route" is not being used, stating that people were "talking past each other", and suggesting Trudeau obtain independent legal advice from former Supreme Court chief justice Beverly McLachlin. Wilson-Raybould is heard suggesting that Trudeau would be "breaching a constitutional principle of prosecutorial independence". On March 19, 2019, the Liberal committee members voted as a bloc to shut down the Justice Committee's investigation.

Trudeau was the subject of an investigation by the ethics commissioner, pursuant to the Conflict of Interest Act, in regard to criminal charges against SNC-Lavalin. The commission's final report, issued August 14, 2019, concluded "Mr. Trudeau contravened section 9 of the Act".

==== WE Charity investigation ====
Following complaints by opposition parties that the Trudeau family had ties to WE Charity, the ethics commissioner on July 3, 2020, announced an investigation into Trudeau's and the government's decision to have the charity administer a summer student-grant program which could assist students financially during the COVID-19 pandemic. Trudeau responded by saying WE was the charity that had the capability to administer such a program. WE and the federal government decided to "part ways", leaving administration of the grant program to the federal government.

WE Charity was criticized for its close ties to the Trudeau family; the investigation came after revelations that Trudeau's mother, brother, and wife were paid nearly $300,000 in total to speak at WE Charity events. On July 16, 2020, the ethics commissioner also announced the investigation was being expanded to include Finance Minister Bill Morneau. Trudeau was ultimately cleared of any wrongdoing by the ethics commissioner, although Morneau was found to have broken the conflict of interest law.

=== Resignation ===
External videos
- " Full speech: Trudeau to resign as Liberal leader" (2025), CBC (7:19min) "transcript"

Following the 2021 federal election, the Liberals faced declining poll numbers and disappointing results in by-elections, including losses in safe seats such as Toronto—St. Paul's in Toronto and LaSalle—Émard—Verdun in Montreal. The months following these losses saw frequent media stories about internal frustration and discontent with Trudeau's leadership. This appeared to culminate in a caucus meeting where multiple members called on Trudeau to resign. Trudeau emerged from this meeting stating that the party remained "strong and united".

The closing months of 2024 saw a wave of resignations in Trudeau's cabinet. On September 19, Minister of Transport Pablo Rodriguez resigned to run for leadership of the Quebec Liberal Party. On November 20, Alberta MP Randy Boissonnault resigned following allegations that he ran a business seeking federal contracts and falsely claimed to be Indigenous. On December 15, Housing Minister Sean Fraser announced his intention to leave the federal cabinet in the next shuffle, citing family reasons.

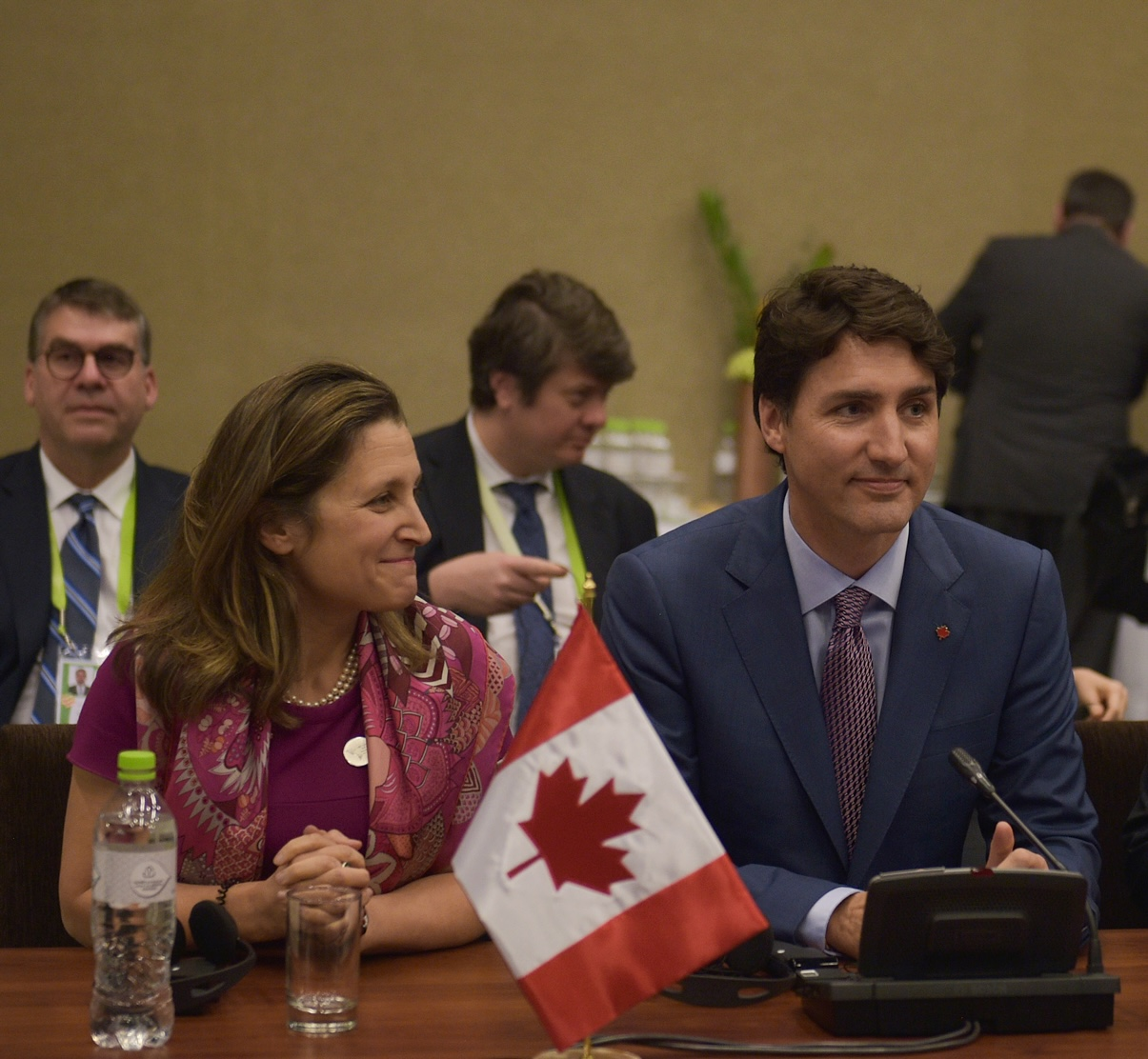
Trudeau seated next to Chrystia Freeland in 2018. Freeland's resignation from Trudeau's Cabinet in December 2024 led to the political crisis.

On December 16, 2024, Chrystia Freeland resigned as Deputy Prime Minister and Minister of Finance, hours before she was due to release the government's fall economic statement. Freeland was often nicknamed the "minister of everything", and widely seen as a potential successor to Trudeau for the leadership of the Liberal Party. In her resignation letter, Freeland reported Trudeau had asked her to resign as finance minister and that she would be offered another Cabinet position. She instead decided to resign altogether from his Cabinet, saying that "to be effective, a Minister must speak on behalf of the Prime Minister and with his full confidence. In making your decision, you made clear that I no longer credibly enjoy that confidence."

Freeland's resignation came amid threats from the incoming Trump administration to impose 25% tariffs upon Canada, as well as Freeland's reported opposition to Trudeau's promise of $250 cheques to working Canadians who earned $150,000 or less in 2023. The resignation raised speculation as to the future of Trudeau's leadership, with renewed calls for his resignation emerging from Liberal MPs. The government's economic statement, released later that day, showed a deficit of $61.9 billion for 2023–24, exceeding the previous target of $40.1 billion or less, and left Trump's tariff threats largely unaddressed.

On January 6, 2025, citing that Canada "[deserved] a real choice in the next election", and that he was facing "internal battles" he felt would be a distraction, Trudeau announced during a news conference at Rideau Cottage that he would tender his resignation as leader of the Liberal Party and as prime minister of Canada after the party elected his successor. He also announced that Governor General Mary Simon would prorogue Parliament until March 24, while the party organized and held its next leadership election. On January 15, Trudeau subsequently confirmed he would not seek re-election in his riding of Papineau. On March 9, the Liberal Party elected Mark Carney as the new leader, and the transition of power from Trudeau to Carney began the following day. On March 14, Trudeau formally notified the governor general of his resignation. Carney was sworn in as the 24th prime minister of Canada later that morning.

== Post-premiership (2025–present) ==
In April 2025, Trudeau made his first public engagement following his resignation, campaigning for Liberal candidate Marjorie Michel in his former riding of Papineau. He was also present for the 2025 Speech from the Throne in May, along with former prime ministers Stephen Harper and Kim Campbell. In January 2026, he attended the World Economic Forum's annual meeting in Davos, Switzerland.

At the 2026 Toronto International Film Festival, Trudeau and his former chief of staff Katie Telford announced the launch of Hope & Hard Work, a film and television production company whose initial projects include adaptations of novels by Perry Chafe and Uzma Jalaluddin.

In November 2026, Trudeau joined Oxford University's Blavatnik School of Government as a distinguished fellow and member of the World Leaders Circle.

== Legacy ==
Retrospective news coverage is split on Trudeau's premiership. The Canadian Press identified cannabis legalization, Indigenous reconciliation initiatives, the Canada Child Benefit, federal carbon pricing, the COVID-19 pandemic response, and the renegotiation of the North American Free Trade Agreement (NAFTA) into the Canada-United States-Mexico Agreement (CUSMA) as major elements of his tenure, while noting that electoral reform was a prominent 2015 promise that was not fulfilled. Reuters noted that Trudeau became one of Canada's longest-serving prime ministers and won praise from progressives for his government's gender parity policies, but that his popularity declined amid rising grocery and housing costs exacerbated by the 2021–2023 inflation surge, caucus unrest due to poor opinion polling and by-election losses, and criticism following Chrystia Freeland's resignation. The Wall Street Journal similarly reported that his standing fell as voters reacted to rising living costs, housing shortages, immigration and climate policies, and controversies including the SNC-Lavalin affair and blackface revelations.

Regarding Trudeau's environmental record, CBC News noted that his government reduced national emissions and increased energy regulations, but left some key climate policies unfinished upon his exit, while The Hill Times characterized Trudeau's tenure as a decade of experimental policy, contrasting it with what it characterized as a more pragmatic approach under his successor, Mark Carney.

== Personal life ==
=== Family and relationships ===
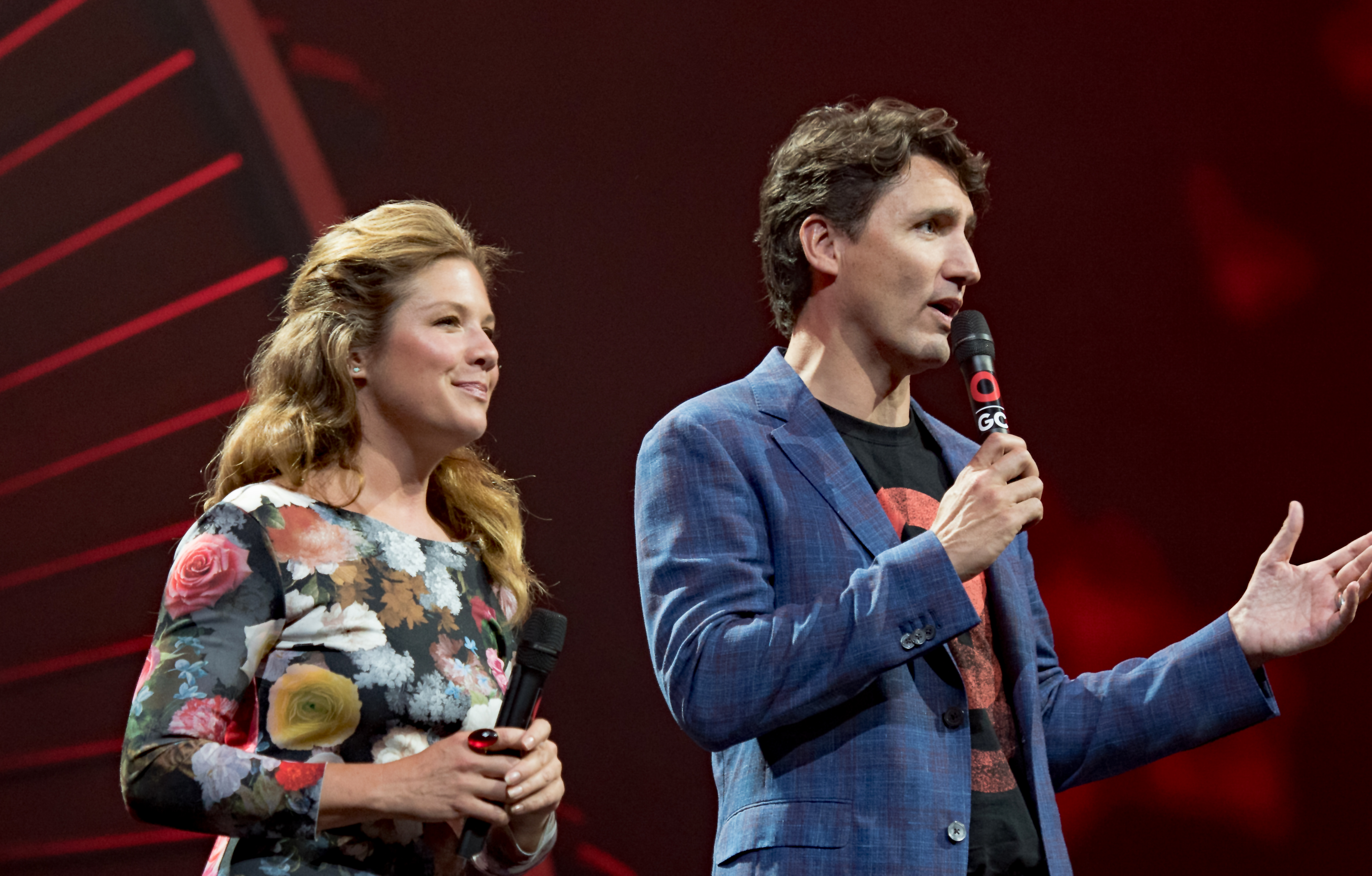
Trudeau with his wife Sophie Grégoire at the 2017 Global Citizen Festival in Hamburg on the eve of the G20 Hamburg summit

Trudeau first met Sophie Grégoire when they were both children growing up in Montreal; Grégoire was a classmate and childhood friend of Trudeau's youngest brother, Michel. They reconnected as adults in June 2003, when Grégoire, by then a Quebec television personality, was assigned as Trudeau's co-host for a charity ball; they began dating several months later. Trudeau and Grégoire became engaged in October 2004 and married on May 28, 2005, in a ceremony at Montreal's Sainte-Madeleine d'Outremont Church. They have three children: a son, Xavier, a daughter, Ella-Grace, and a second son, Hadrien.

In June 2013, two months after Trudeau became the leader of the Liberal Party, the couple sold their home in the Côte-des-Neiges neighbourhood of Montreal. They began living in a rented home in Ottawa's Rockcliffe Park, the neighbourhood near where Trudeau resided as a child during his father's time as prime minister.

On August 18, 2014, an intruder broke into the house while Grégoire and the couple's three children were sleeping and left a threatening note; however, nothing was stolen and there was no damage to the property. Following the incident, Trudeau, who was in Winnipeg at the time of the break-in, stated his intention to inquire with the Royal Canadian Mounted Police about his home security. After his 2015 electoral victory, Trudeau opted to live at Rideau Cottage, on the grounds of Rideau Hall.

On August 2, 2023, Trudeau announced he and Grégoire had separated. On August 21, Trudeau said he was focusing on his children and the future.

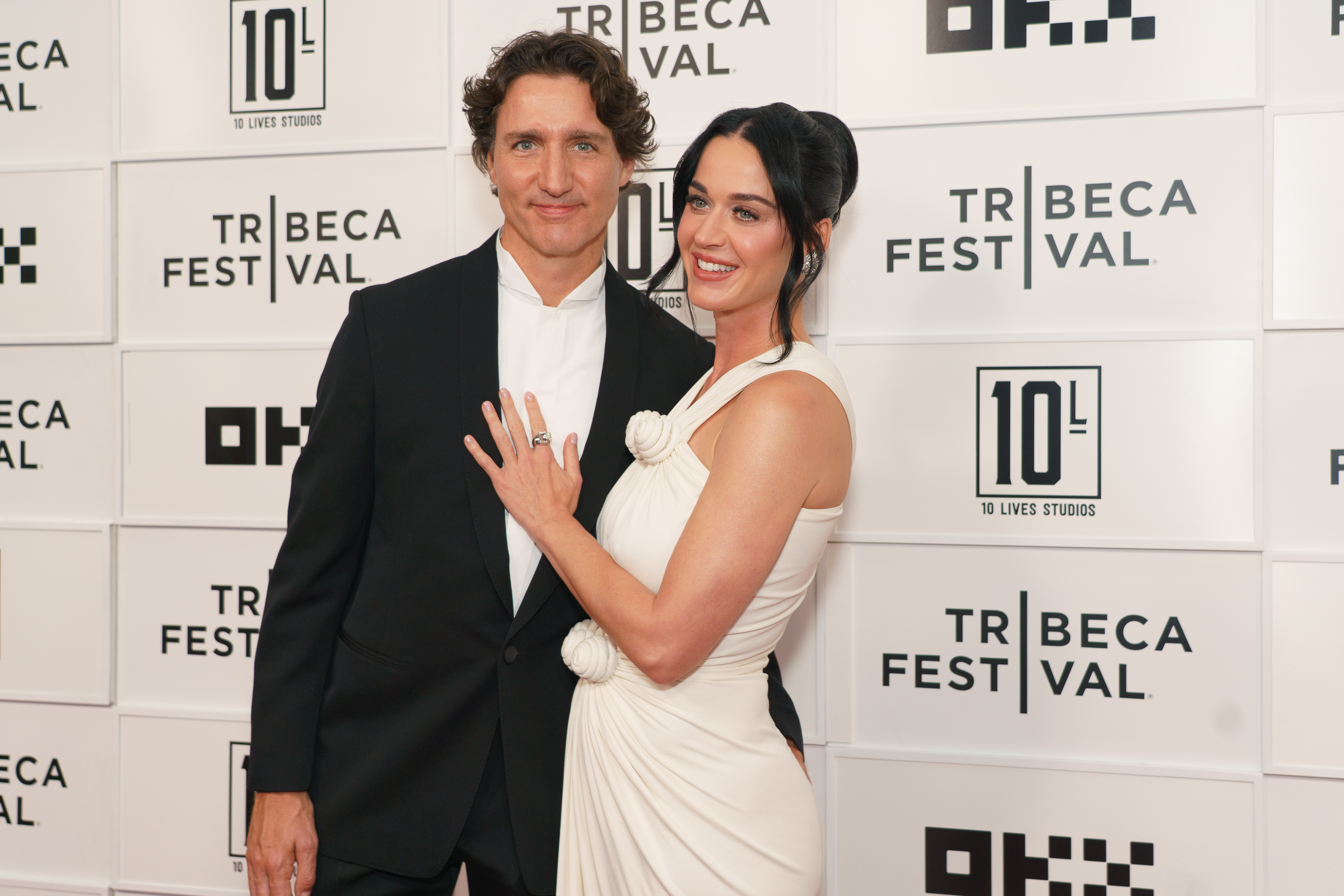
Trudeau and Perry in June 2026

In 2025, it was reported that Trudeau was dating American singer Katy Perry. On December 6, the two confirmed their relationship on Instagram.

Trudeau resided in Ottawa for a year following his resignation as prime minister. In February 2026, he purchased a family home in the Montreal borough of Outremont after announcing he would be moving back to Montreal. The real estate documents indicate Trudeau is the sole owner of the property and state that he and Grégoire Trudeau are in the process of divorcing.

=== Religion ===
Trudeau's father was a practising Catholic and his mother converted from Anglicanism to Catholicism just before their wedding. Trudeau himself became a lapsed Catholic at age 18, as he felt that much of his day-to-day life was not addressed by the formality and structure of the church. Trudeau described his faith during this period as "like so many Catholics across this country, I said, 'OK, I'm Catholic, I'm of faith, but I'm just not really going to go to church. Maybe on Easter, maybe midnight Mass at Christmas.'" After the death of his brother Michel in 1998, Trudeau was persuaded by a friend to participate in an Alpha course, during which he regained his faith. In 2011, Trudeau stated, "My own personal faith is an extremely important part of who I am and the values that I try to lead with."

== Honours ==
Under Canadian protocol, former prime ministers retain the style "The Right Honourable" for life.

| Ribbon | Description | Notes |
| | Queen Elizabeth II Diamond Jubilee Medal for Canada | February 6, 2012: As an elected Member of the House of Commons of Canada, Trudeau was awarded the medal as a member of the Canadian order of precedence. |
| | Grand Cross of the Order of La Pléiade | June 19, 2019: Trudeau received this honorary award from the International Organization of La Francophonie. |
| | Order of Liberty (Ukraine) | August 23, 2024: Trudeau was awarded this distinction by President Volodymyr Zelenskyy for outstanding contributions to strengthening Ukrainian-Canadian relations, supporting Ukraine's state sovereignty, and territorial integrity. |
| | Légion d'honneur — Grand Officier | February 2025: Appointed by President Emmanuel Macron during the AI Action Summit in Paris; announced on 14 July 2026. |
| | King Charles III Coronation Medal (Canadian Version) | June 20, 2025: As a former prime minister of Canada, Trudeau was awarded the medal as a member of the Canadian order of precedence. |

Coat of arms of Justin Trudeau

Following the death of his father, Pierre Trudeau, on September 8, 2000, Justin Trudeau inherited his father's arms and crest, which had originally been granted by the Canadian Heraldic Authority on December 7, 1994.

In 2015, The Canadian Press named Trudeau "Newsmaker of the Year".

Honorary degrees

| Location | Date | School | Degree | Gave commencement address |
|---|---|---|---|---|
| Scotland | July 5, 2017 | University of Edinburgh | Doctorate | Yes |
| New York | May 16, 2018 | New York University | Doctor of Laws (LL.D.) | Yes |

Other awards and honours

| Year | Awarded | Awarder | Reference |
| 2018 | Polio Eradication Champion Award | Rotary International | |
| 2020 | Honorary Fellowship | Royal Canadian Geographical Society | |
| 2025 | Global Leadership Award | Chicago Council on Global Affairs | |

== Published works ==
- Trudeau, Justin (October 20, 2014). Common Ground. Toronto, Ontario: HarperCollins Publishers Ltd. ISBN 978-1-4434-3337-2. OCLC 893647393.

== Notes ==
Parliament of Canada
| Preceded by Vivian Barbot | Member of Parliament for Papineau; 2008–2025 | Succeeded by Marjorie Michel |
Party political offices
| Preceded by Bob Rae; Interim | Leader of the Liberal Party; 2013–2025 | Succeeded by Mark Carney |
Political offices
| Preceded by Stephen Harper | Prime Minister of Canada; 2015–2025 | Succeeded by Mark Carney |
Diplomatic posts
| Preceded by Paolo Gentiloni | Chair of the Group of Seven; 2018 | Succeeded by Emmanuel Macron |
Order of precedence
| Preceded by Stephen Harper as Former prime minister | Canadian order of precedence as Former prime minister | Succeeded by Beverly McLachlin as Former chief justice |
