= Public services in Canada =

Public services in Canada are delivered by various levels of government, determined through responsibility enacted in the Constitution. Financing for those services is provided through tax receipts, sales revenues, user fees, and other government revenue sources.

== Services ==
Service	Jurisdiction	Funding	Notes
Health care	Provincial	provincial income tax, federal health transfer	
Education	Provincial	Provincial income tax, municipal and regional property taxes	An education tax is part of each household's property tax bill; funding of libraries is a municipal responsibility, except in remote and First Nations communities, for which the provincial or federal government supplies funding
Postal service	Federal	Federal income tax, sales revenue	
Law enforcement	Federal, provincial and municipal		Includes police and border services
Fire and emergency services	Municipal	Municipal property taxes	Includes ambulatory and paramedic service
Water and wastewater	Municipal and/or regional	Property taxes, user fees	Remote communities and First Nations receive service from provincial government; in some areas, regional governments assume portions of capital costs
Waste management	Municipal and/or regional	Property taxes, user fees	Includes solid waste, recycling, composting, and hazardous waste treatment; fees may be charged by some municipal governments for exceeding certain limits of refuse disposal

== Health care ==
Primary health care in Canada is a provincial responsibility. Funding for service delivery is provided via provincial income tax receipts and federal health transfers.

== Education ==
The Constitution Act, 1867 assigns primary responsibility for education to the provinces; accordingly, primary, secondary, and tertiary education are administered by provincial governments, subject to certain constitutional provisions and limited federal involvement. As a part of its treaty obligations, the federal department of Indian and Northern Affairs Canada delivers education service to First Nations.
