= List of prime ministers of Canada by date of death =

This is a complete list of Canadian prime ministers by date of death.

John A. Macdonald and John Thompson were the only prime ministers to die in office. Four prime ministers have died outside of Canada; three in the United Kingdom and one in the United States. Richard Bennett is the only prime minister to be buried outside of Canada.

== List ==
Order of Death	Name	Date of death	Order of Office	Cause of death	Age at Death	Lifespan after office	Place of death Place of burial	Image
1	John A. Macdonald	6 June 1891	1	Stroke	75 years, 330 days	0 days	Ottawa, Ontario Cataraqui Cemetery, Kingston, Ontario	
2	Alexander Mackenzie	17 April 1892	2	Stroke from a fall hitting his head	70 years, 80 days	13 years, 192 days	Toronto, Ontario Lakeview Cemetery Sarnia, Ontario	
3	John Abbott	30 October 1893	3	Brain cancer	72 years, 232 days	340 days	Montreal, Quebec Mount Royal Cemetery, Montreal, Quebec	
4	John Thompson	12 December 1894	4	Heart attack	49 years, 32 days	0 days	Windsor Castle, England Holy Cross Cemetery, Halifax, Nova Scotia	
5	Charles Tupper	30 October 1915	6	Heart failure	94 years, 120 days	19 years, 186 days	Bexleyheath, Kent, England St. John's Cemetery, Halifax, Nova Scotia.	
6	Mackenzie Bowell	10 December 1917	5	Pneumonia	93 years, 348 days	21 years, 155 days	Belleville, Ontario Belleville Cemetery, Belleville, Ontario	
7	Wilfrid Laurier	17 February 1919	7	Stroke	77 years, 89 days	7 years, 134 days	Ottawa, Ontario Notre Dame Cemetery, Ottawa, Ontario	
8	Robert Borden	10 June 1937	8	Heart failure	82 years, 349 days	16 years, 335 days	Ottawa, Ontario Beechwood Cemetery, Ottawa, Ontario	
9	R. B. Bennett	26 June 1947	11	Heart attack while taking a bath	76 years, 358 days	11 years, 246 days	Mickleham, England St. Michael's Churchyard, Mickleham, England	
10	W. L. Mackenzie King	22 July 1950	10	Pneumonia	75 years, 217 days	1 year, 249 days	Chelsea, Quebec Mount Pleasant Cemetery, Toronto	
11	Arthur Meighen	5 August 1960	9	Heart failure	86 years, 50 days	33 years, 315 days	Toronto, Ontario St. Marys Cemetery, St. Marys, Ontario	
12	Lester B. Pearson	27 December 1972	14	Cancer	75 years, 248 days	4 years, 251 days	Ottawa, Ontario MacLaren Cemetery, Wakefield, Quebec	
13	Louis St. Laurent	25 July 1973	12	Heart failure	91 years, 174 days	16 years, 34 days	Quebec City, Quebec St. Thomas Aquinas Cemetery, Compton, Quebec	
14	John Diefenbaker	16 August 1979	13	Heart attack	83 years, 332 days	16 years, 116 days	Ottawa, Ontario Diefenbaker Centre, University of Saskatchewan	
15	Pierre Trudeau	28 September 2000	15	Parkinson's disease and prostate cancer	80 years, 346 days	16 years, 90 days	Montreal, Quebec St-Remi-de-Napierville Cemetery, Saint-Rémi, Quebec (state funeral)	
16	John Turner	19 September 2020	17	Congestive heart failure	91 years, 104 days	36 years, 2 days	Toronto, Ontario Mount Pleasant Cemetery, Toronto	
17	Brian Mulroney	29 February 2024	18	Complications following a fall and cardiac issues	84 years, 346 days	30 years, 249 days	Palm Beach, Florida, U.S. Notre Dame des Neiges Cemetery, Montreal	

== See also ==
- State funerals in Canada
