= Pouliot (surname) =

Pouliot is a Canadian surname that may refer to

- Adrien Pouliot (1896–1980), Canadian mathematician and educator
  - Adrien Pouliot Award, presented annually by the Canadian Mathematical Society
- Adrien D. Pouliot (born c. 1958), Quebec businessman and politician
- Anais Pouliot (born 1991), Canadian model
- Barthélemy Pouliot (1811–1890), Quebec businessman and political figure
- Benoît Pouliot (born 1986), Canadian ice hockey left winger
- Blake Pouliot (born 1994), Canadian-American classical violinist
- Camille-Eugène Pouliot (1897–1967), Canadian physician and politician
- Charles-Eugène Pouliot (1856–1897), Quebec lawyer and political figure
- Derrick Pouliot (born 1994), Canadian ice hockey defenceman
- François A. Pouliot (1896–1990), Canadian politician
- Georges Pouliot (1923–2019), Canadian fencer
- Gilles Pouliot (born 1942), Canadian politician
- Jean Pouliot (1923–2004), Canadian TV broadcasting pioneer
- Jean-Baptiste Pouliot (1816–1888), Quebec notary and political figure
- Jean-François Pouliot (born 1957), Quebec film director
- Jean-François Pouliot (politician) (1890–1969), Quebec lawyer, author and political figure
- Marc-Antoine Pouliot (born 1985), Canadian ice hockey player
- Mario Pouliot (born 1963), Canadian ice hockey coach and general manager
- Matthew Pouliot (born 1986), American politician
