= Michel Guillaume Baby =

Canadian politician (1834–1911)

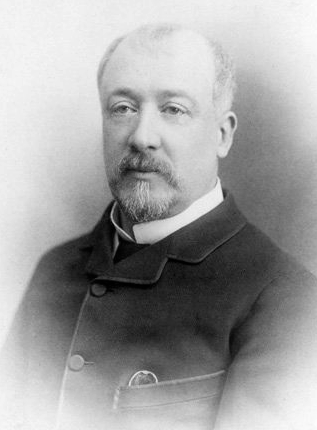

Member of the Legislative Assembly of Quebec for Chicoutimi et Saguenay
- In office 1874–1875
- Preceded by: Pierre-Alexis Tremblay
- Succeeded by: William Evan Price

Member of the Legislative Assembly of the Province of Canada for Rimouski
- In office 1857–1861
- Preceded by: Joseph-Charles Taché
- Succeeded by: George Sylvain

Member of the Legislative Assembly of the Province of Canada for Témiscouata
- In office 1861–1863
- Preceded by: Benjamin Dionne
- Succeeded by: Jean-Baptiste Pouliot

Personal details
- Born: September 15, 1834 Saint-Philippe-de-La Prairie, Lower Canada
- Died: March 16, 1911 (aged 76) Paris, France
- Party: Conservative Party of Quebec

Michel-Guillaume Baby (September 15, 1834 – March 16, 1911) was a businessman and political figure in Quebec. He represented Rimouski from 1857 to 1861 and Témiscouata from 1861 to 1863 in the Legislative Assembly of the Province of Canada and Chicoutimi et Saguenay from 1874 to 1875 in the Legislative Assembly of Quebec as a Conservative. His name also appears as Michel William Baby.

He was born in Saint-Philippe-de-La Prairie, Lower Canada, the son of Charles François Xavier Baby and Clothilde Pinsonaut. Baby was a shareholder in the Grand Trunk Railway, as well as president of the Quebec and Lake St. John Railway, originally incorporated as the Quebec and Gosford Railway. He was first elected to the legislative assembly for the Province of Canada in an 1857 by-election held after Joseph-Charles Taché resigned his seat. In 1868, he married Marie-Hélène-Wilhelmine, the daughter of Jean-Baptiste Renaud. Baby was first elected to the Quebec assembly in an 1874 by-election held after Pierre-Alexis Tremblay resigned his seat. He did not run for reelection in 1875 and later moved to Paris. Baby died there at the age of 76 and was buried in Quebec City.
