= Léo Bérubé =

Canadian lawyer and politician

Member of the Legislative Assembly of Quebec for Témiscouata
- In office 1912–1916
- Preceded by: Napoléon Dion
- Succeeded by: Louis-Eugène-Aduire Parrot

Personal details
- Born: October 27, 1884 Saint-André, in Kamouraska, Quebec
- Died: May 18, 1967 (aged 82) Rivière-du-Loup, Quebec
- Party: Conservative

Léo Bérubé, KC (October 27, 1884 – May 18, 1967) was a Canadian lawyer and politician.

Born in Saint-André, in Kamouraska, Quebec, Bérubé was educated at the Université Laval. He was admitted to the Quebec Bar in 1908. He was made a King's Counsel in 1938. He was a practising lawyer in Rivière-du-Loup for 40 years. Bérubé was elected to the Legislative Assembly of Quebec for Témiscouata in 1912. A Conservative, he was defeated in 1916 and again in 1923.

He died in Rivière-du-Loup in 1967.
