= Charles-Eugène Pouliot =

Canadian politician

Member of the Canadian Parliament for Témiscouata
- In office 1896–1897
- Preceded by: Paul-Étienne Grandbois
- Succeeded by: Charles Arthur Gauvreau

Member of the Legislative Assembly of Quebec for Témiscouata
- In office 1890–1892
- Preceded by: Georges-Honoré Deschênes
- Succeeded by: Napoléon Rioux

Personal details
- Born: 19 December 1856 Fraserville (Rivière-du-Loup), Canada East
- Died: 24 June 1897 (aged 40) Fraserville (Rivière-du-Loup), Quebec
- Party: Liberal
- Relations: Jean-Baptiste Pouliot, father Camille-Eugène Pouliot, nephew
- Children: Jean-François Pouliot

Charles-Eugène Pouliot (19 December 1856 – 24 June 1897) was a lawyer and political figure in Quebec. He represented Témiscouata in the Legislative Assembly of Quebec from 1890 to 1892 and Témiscouata in the House of Commons of Canada from 1896 to 1897 as a Liberal.

He was born in Rivière-du-Loup, Canada East, the son of Jean-Baptiste Pouliot and Sophronie Blais. Pouliot was educated at the Séminaire de Québec and went on to study law at the Université Laval. He was called to the Quebec bar in 1879 and set up practice in Rivière-du-Loup. Pouliot ran unsuccessfully for a federal seat in 1887. In the same year, he was married to Stella-Anita Bertrand. He was defeated by Napoléon Rioux when he ran for reelection to the Quebec assembly in 1892. He died in office in Fraserville at the age of 40.

His son Jean-François Pouliot served in the House of Commons and Canadian senate. His nephew Camille-Eugène Pouliot also served as a member of the Quebec assembly.

== Archives ==
There is a Charles-Eugène Pouliot fonds at Library and Archives Canada. Archival reference number is MG27-IIE7.
