= Louis-Eugène-Aduire Parrot =

Canadian politician

Member of the Legislative Assembly of Quebec for Témiscouata
- In office 1916–1921
- Preceded by: Léo Bérubé
- Succeeded by: Eugène Godbout

Personal details
- Born: November 11, 1871 Sainte-Emmélie, near Lotbinière, Quebec
- Died: November 18, 1948 (aged 77) Quebec City, Quebec
- Party: Liberal

Louis-Eugène-Aduire Parrot (November 11, 1871 – November 18, 1948) was a Canadian physician and politician.

Born in Sainte-Emmélie, near Lotbinière, Quebec, Parrot studied at the Séminaire de Québec and the Université Laval. He became a physician in 1897 and practised general medicine in Deschaillons from 1897 to 1905. He did a surgery internship in Paris in 1905 and 1906. Returning to Quebec, he was a physician and surgeon in Fraserville (Rivière-du-Loup) from 1907 to 1939.

Parrot was elected to the Legislative Assembly of Quebec for Témiscouata in 1916. A Liberal, he was acclaimed in 1919. He resigned in 1921. He was defeated as the Liberal candidate for the House of Commons of Canada in a 1924 by-election in Témiscouata losing to Jean-François Pouliot.

He died in Quebec City in 1948.
