= Pouliot =

Pouliot may refer to

- Pouliot (surname)
- Adrien Pouliot Award, presented annually by the Canadian Mathematical Society
- Michel-Pouliot Gaspé Airport in Quebec, Canada
