= Philippe Gagnon =

Canadian politician (1909–2001)

Member of Parliament for Rivière-du-Loup—Témiscouata
- In office September 1962 – April 1963
- Preceded by: Antoine Fréchette
- Succeeded by: Rosaire Gendron

Personal details
- Born: 9 May 1909 Bégon, Quebec
- Died: 19 September 2001 (aged 92) Saint-Michel-du-Squatec, Quebec
- Party: Social Credit
- Spouse(s): Therese Beaulieu (m. 24 Jul 1935)
- Profession: agent, farmer, salesman

Louis-Philippe Gagnon (9 May 1909 – 19 September 2001) was a Social Credit party member of the House of Commons of Canada. Born in St-Jean-de-Dieu, Quebec, he was an agent, farmer and salesman by career.

He was first elected at the Rivière-du-Loup—Témiscouata riding in the 1962 general election. After serving only one short term, the 25th Parliament, Gagnon was defeated in the 1963 federal election by Rosaire Gendron of the Liberal party. Gagnon attempted to unseat Gendron in the 1968 and 1972 elections but was unsuccessful on those occasions. He died in 2001.
