= Jean-Paul St. Laurent =

Canadian politician

Member of Parliament for Témiscouata
- In office 9 September 1955 – 30 March 1958
- Preceded by: Jean-François Pouliot
- Succeeded by: Antoine Fréchette

Personal details
- Born: 23 April 1912 Quebec City, Quebec, Canada
- Died: 22 December 1986 (aged 74) Quebec, Canada
- Party: Liberal
- Spouse(s): Madeleine Hamel (m. 28 May 1936)
- Children: 4
- Profession: Lawyer

Jean-Paul Stephen St-Laurent (23 April 1912 – 22 December 1986) was a Canadian politician. He was born in Quebec City, Quebec.

The son of former Prime Minister Louis St. Laurent and Jeanne Renault, Jean-Paul represented the electoral district of Témiscouata in the House of Commons of Canada from 1955 to 1958 while his father was Prime Minister.

St. Laurent was a member of the Liberal Party. He was swept out in the massive Progressive Conservative landslide of 1958 that saw the Tories win the most seats in Quebec for the only time from 1896 to 1980.

He died aged 74 in 1986.
