= Félix-Alonzo Talbot =

Canadian politician

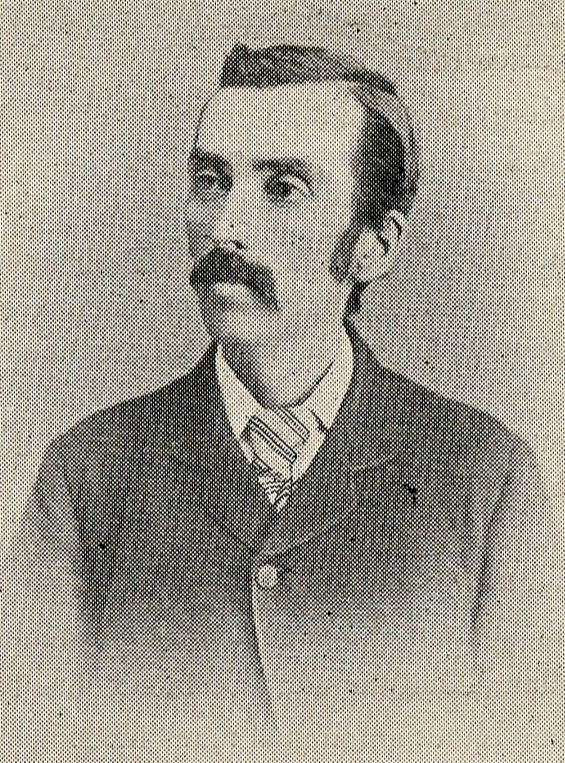

Member of the Legislative Assembly of Quebec for Témiscouata
- In office 1897–1900
- Preceded by: Napoléon Rioux
- Succeeded by: Napoléon Dion

Personal details
- Born: January 9, 1860 Cacouna, Canada East
- Died: December 13, 1915 (aged 55) Cacouna, Quebec
- Party: Liberal

Félix-Alonzo Talbot (January 9, 1860 – December 13, 1915) was a Canadian politician.

Born in Cacouna, Canada East, Talbot studied in Cacouna, at the Laval Normal School in Quebec City, and at the Royal Military College Saint-Jean. He received a teaching certificate in 1884 and was a teacher in the Model School in Cacouna. He was elected to the Legislative Assembly of Quebec for Témiscouata in 1897. A Liberal, he did not run in 1900 and was defeated in the 1904 election.

He died in Cacouna in 1915.
