= Charles Bertrand (politician) =

Canadian politician

Member of the Canada Parliament for Témiscouata
- In office November 6, 1867 – July 8, 1872
- Succeeded by: Élie Mailloux

Personal details
- Born: Charles-Frédéric Bertrand; January 11, 1824 L'Isle-Verte, Lower Canada
- Died: April 2, 1896 (aged 72) L'Isle-Verte, Quebec
- Party: Conservative

Charles Bertrand (January 11, 1824 – April 2, 1896) was a Quebec businessman, seigneur and political figure. He represented Témiscouata in the 1st Canadian Parliament as a Conservative member.

He was born Charles-Frédéric Bertrand in L'Isle-Verte, Lower Canada in 1824, the son of Louis Bertrand, who purchased the seigneury of Île-Verte in 1849. He attended the Petit Séminaire de Québec. In 1850, Bertrand married Arthémise Dionne, daughter of Benjamin Dionne, and, that same year, his father gave him control over the seigneury. He owned several mills, a factory producing agricultural implements, a foundry and four schooners. He owned cutting rights for timber and operated a sawmill; he also owned a store in L'Isle-Verte. He served as mayor there in 1859 and from 1881 to 1885. Bertrand was also a director of the Témiscouata Railway.

He died in L'Isle-Verte in 1896. Just before his death, the industrial empire that he had built there began to fall apart, due to competition from other companies, bad luck, his son's lack of interest in the business and the unexpected death of Jean-Baptiste Raymond, whom he had been grooming to take over the operation.
