= Georges-Honoré Deschênes =

Canadian politician

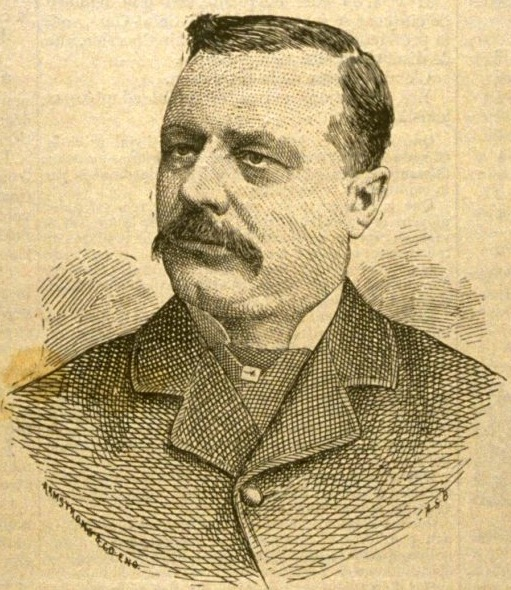

Member of the Legislative Assembly of Quebec for Témiscouata
- In office 1875–1890
- Preceded by: Élie Mailloux
- Succeeded by: Charles-Eugène Pouliot

Personal details
- Born: August 25, 1841 Cacouna, Canada East
- Died: August 11, 1892 (aged 50) Saint-Épiphane, Quebec
- Party: Conservative; Liberal

Georges-Honoré Deschênes (August 25, 1841 – August 11, 1892) was a farmer, businessman and politician in Quebec. He represented Témiscouata in the Legislative Assembly of Quebec from 1875 to 1890 as a Liberal and then Conservative member.

He was born in Cacouna, Canada East, the adopted son of Hilary Gagnon and Adeline Pelletier, and was educated there. He later moved with his adoptive family to Saint-Épiphane. In 1864, he married Suzanne Michaud. Deschênes was secretary-treasurer for Saint-Épiphane from 1872 to 1875 and from 1876 to 1882. He was named Indian agent in 1872. He was also a director for the Témiscouata Railway and was director and then vice-president for the agricultural society for Témiscouata County. After being elected as a Liberal in 1875, Deschênes was elected as a Conservative in 1878, 1881 and 1886. He ran unsuccessfully for a seat in the House of Commons in 1891. Later in life, he was involved in the lumber trade and operated two sawmills. Deschênes died in Saint-Épiphane at the age of 50.
