= Charles Arthur Gauvreau =

Canadian politician

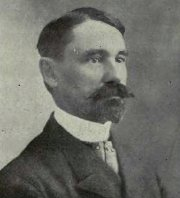

Member of the Canada Parliament for Témiscouata
- In office November 6, 1897 – October 9, 1924
- Preceded by: Charles Eugène Pouliot
- Succeeded by: Jean-François Pouliot

Personal details
- Born: September 29, 1860 L'Isle-Verte, Canada East
- Died: October 9, 1924 (aged 64)
- Party: Liberal

Charles Arthur Gauvreau (September 29, 1860 – October 9, 1924) was a Canadian author, notary, and politician.

Born in L'Isle-Verte, Canada East, Gauvreau was educated at the College of Rimouski and Laval University. A notary, he was the author of Captive et Bourreau, Les épreuves d'un orphelin, and Histoire de Trois-Pistoles. He was first elected to House of Commons of Canada for the electoral district of Témiscouata in an 1897 by-election. A Liberal, he was re-elected in 1900, 1904, 1908, 1911, 1917, and 1921. He died in office in 1924.
