= Benjamin Dionne =

Businessman and political figure in Canada East

Benjamin Dionne (1798 – June 28, 1883) was a businessman and political figure in Canada East.

He was born at Kamouraska in 1798. He entered business at Cacouna as a merchant around 1825. He served as lieutenant-colonel in the local militia and also as mayor of Cacouna. In 1854, he was elected to the Legislative Assembly of the Province of Canada for Témiscouata; he was reelected in 1858.

He died at Cacouna in 1883.

His daughter Arthémise married seigneur Charles Bertrand who became a member of the Canadian House of Commons.
