= Jean-Baptiste Renaud =

Canadian businessman

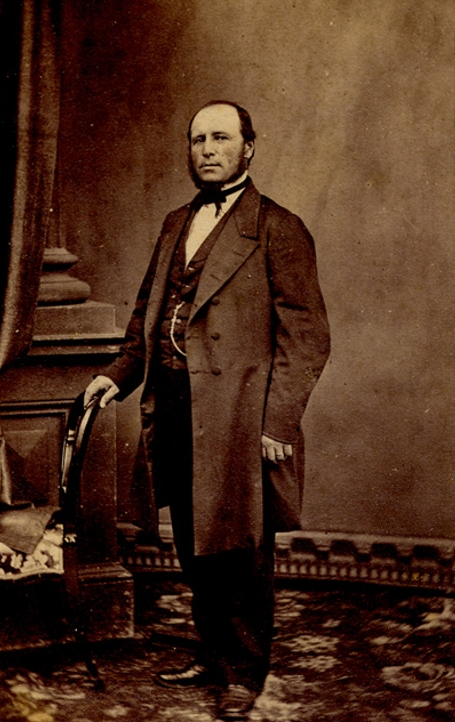
- Born: June 22, 1816; Lachine, Lower Canada
- Died: March 1, 1884 (aged 67); Quebec City, Quebec
- Known for: merchant, businessman, and municipal councillor

Jean-Baptiste Renaud (June 22, 1816 – March 1, 1884) was a prominent businessman, merchant and land owner in Quebec. He served as a member of the Quebec Board of Trade and represented Saint-Pierre Ward on the municipal council for Quebec City from 1862 to 1868.

He was born in Lachine, Lower Canada, the son of Jean-Baptiste Renaud and Marie Gariépy. He left school early and became a carter (a transporter of goods) in Montreal; he was joined in business by his brother Louis. In 1841, he married Marie-Sophie Lefebvre. He opened a store in partnership with his brother in 1847. In 1850, he moved to Quebec City, where he opened a store, operated flour mills and owned schooners operating on the Saint Lawrence River. Renaud was a director of the North Shore Railway, the Union Bank of Lower Canada, the Quebec North Shore Turnpike Roads Company, the Richelieu and Ontario Navigation Company and the Quebec and Gosford Railway, which later became the Quebec and Lake St. John Railway; he also helped found the St. Maurice Railway and Navigation Company, the Salaberry Navigation Company of Montreal, the St. Lawrence Navigation Company, the Quebec Marine Insurance Company and the Quebec and Lake St. John Lumbering and Trading Company. He constructed warehouses and docks and also acquired several large properties at Quebec. In 1880, with Joseph Tassé, Alexandre Lacoste, and Aimé Gélinas, he purchased the La Minerve. Around 1880, his partners Gaspard Le Moine and Victor Chateauvert purchased the firm of J.-B. Renaud and Company. By this time, Renaud had become one of the most important French-speaking businessmen in Quebec.

Renaud died in Quebec City at the age of 77.

His daughter Marie-Hélène-Wilhelmine married Michel-Guillaume Baby.
