= Témiscouata (provincial electoral district) =

Coordinates: 47.65°N 68.87°W

Quebec electoral district

Defunct provincial electoral district
- Legislature: National Assembly of Quebec
- District created: 1867
- District abolished: 1972
- First contested: 1867
- Last contested: 1970

Témiscouata (French pronunciation: [temiskwata]) was a provincial electoral district in the Bas-Saint-Laurent region of Quebec, Canada.

It was created for the 1867 election (and an electoral district of that name existed earlier in the Legislative Assembly of the Province of Canada). Its final election was in 1970. It disappeared in the 1973 election and its successor electoral district was Kamouraska-Témiscouata.

== Members of the Legislative Assembly / National Assembly ==
- Michel Guillaume Baby (1861–1863)
- Élie Mailloux, Conservative Party (1867–1875)
- Georges-Honoré Deschênes, Liberal – Conservative Party (1875–1890)
- Charles-Eugène Pouliot, Liberal (1890–1892)
- Napoléon Rioux, Conservative Party (1892–1897)
- Félix-Alonzo Talbot, Liberal (1897–1900)
- Napoléon Dion, Liberal (1900–1912)
- Léo Bérubé, Conservative Party (1912–1916)
- Louis-Eugène-Aduire Parrot, Liberal (1916–1921)
- Eugène Godbout, Liberal (1921–1923)
- Jules Langlais, Conservative Party (1923–1927)
- Léon Casgrain, Liberal (1927–1931)
- Joseph-Wilfrid Morel, Liberal (1931–1935)
- Joseph-Alphonse Beaulieu, Liberal (1935–1936)
- Louis-Félix Dubé Union Nationale (1936–1939)
- Joseph-Alphonse Beaulieu, Liberal (1939–1944)
- André Pelletier, Union Nationale (1944–1952)
- Antoine Raymond, Union Nationale (1952–1966)
- Montcalm Simard, Union Nationale (1966–1973)
