= Death and state funeral of Pierre Trudeau =

2000 ceremonial funeral in Montreal, Canada

The death and state funeral of Pierre Trudeau took place in 2000. Pierre Trudeau was the 15th prime minister of Canada, serving from 1968 to 1984, with a brief interruption in 1979–1980. Trudeau died on September 28, 2000. His casket lay in state on Parliament Hill from September 30 to October 1 and the following day at Montreal City Hall. On October 3, a state funeral was held at Notre-Dame Basilica in Montreal.

== Death and tributes ==
Trudeau died on Thursday, September 28 at 3:00 p.m. at his home in Montréal with his surviving sons, Justin (who became the 23rd Prime Minister of Canada in 2015) and Sacha, and his former wife, Margaret at his side. His death came 20 days before his 81st birthday. He had Parkinson's disease and prostate cancer.

=== Tributes ===
Flags on the Peace Tower, across Canada, and around the world were ordered flown at half-staff until sunset the day of the funeral. People started to arrive at Trudeau's home and set up a makeshift memorial there. There were tributes from world leaders, including U.S. President Bill Clinton.

The Centennial Flame on Parliament Hill became the unofficial place to mark Trudeau's death, where people brought messages of condolence and roses, Pierre Trudeau's symbol. Queen Elizabeth II paid tribute to her former prime minister and, in the House of Commons, Canada's political leaders did the same, beginning with Prime Minister Jean Chrétien, who, at the time of Trudeau's death, was on his way to Jamaica and immediately returned to Ottawa. Opposition Leader Stockwell Day, Progressive Conservative leader Joe Clark (a former prime minister), New Democratic Party leader Alexa McDonough, and Bloc Québécois leader Gilles Duceppe followed, as did Speaker of the House of Commons Gilbert Parent. Members of Parliament paid tribute to Trudeau, many wearing roses, before the house adjourned out of respect.

Cuban President Fidel Castro announced three days of national mourning with flags half-masted as a sign of respect.

== Parliament Hill events ==
On September 30, the state funeral events began. Trudeau's casket was flown to Ottawa on a Canadian Forces jet. On arrival, it was driven by hearse in a simple procession through the nation's capital to Parliament Hill.

As the casket arrived on the Hill, the Peace Tower bell tolled 81 times, one for each year of Trudeau's life (Trudeau died just three weeks short of his 81st birthday).

=== Lying in state ===
Trudeau's casket was carried by a Royal Canadian Mounted Police guard of honour into the Hall of Honour in Parliament Hill's Centre Block to lie in state. His family spent about 15 minutes alone with the casket, away from the press. Governor General Adrienne Clarkson and her husband, John Ralston Saul, and Chrétien and his wife, Aline, then paid their respects.

Over the next hour dignitaries, including senators, Members of Parliament, and the diplomatic corps viewed the casket of the former prime minister.

=== Public viewing ===
After the dignitaries paid their respects, the doors of Parliament Hill's Centre Block were opened to citizens waiting outside. A constant stream of people, some waiting as long as seven hours, passed Trudeau's casket as it lay in the Hall of Honour. Many also brought roses—a Trudeau signature—to place around the Centennial Flame at the foot of Centre Block.

About 60,000 people passed Trudeau's casket while it lay in state. Trudeau's ex-wife, Margaret, was one.

=== Final tributes ===
The final tributes in Ottawa happened on October 2. Prime Minister Jean Chrétien and other dignitaries paid their final respects. A 19-gun salute was fired when Trudeau's casket exited the building. The Canadian Forces Central Band played the national anthem.

In the cortege were Trudeau's sons, the Prime Minister and his wife, and close friends. The band played "Auld Lang Syne" as the cortege left Parliament Hill.

== Journey to Montreal ==
Crowds lined the route of the cortege as it made its way to the Ottawa train station, where the casket was placed aboard a VIA train that would take it from Ottawa to Montreal.

=== Train ride ===
The rail lines that had brought Trudeau to Ottawa 35 years earlier as a politician now took his body back home to Montreal. Prime Minister Chrétien and his wife watched a special Via Rail passenger train as it departed the Ottawa Train Station with Trudeau's casket placed in the lower lounge of the observation car Yoho Park. Onlookers applauded, sang the national anthem or both.

Trudeau's sons asked that the train be slowed along its route through the towns and farmlands of eastern Ontario so that citizens would have the opportunity to pay their respects.

=== Montreal ===
On arrival in Montreal, Trudeau's casket was taken to City Hall, where about 15,000 people paid their respects.

== State funeral ==
The official state funeral was held at Montreal's Notre-Dame Basilica on October 3, 2000.

The day began at City Hall. Trudeau's family spent some moments alone with his casket before it was removed and driven to the Basilica, surrounded by an escort of ten RCMP officers. Along the route, some clapped, while others wept, waved Canadian flags or simply stood silently as Trudeau made his final journey through his native Montreal.

=== Funeral service ===
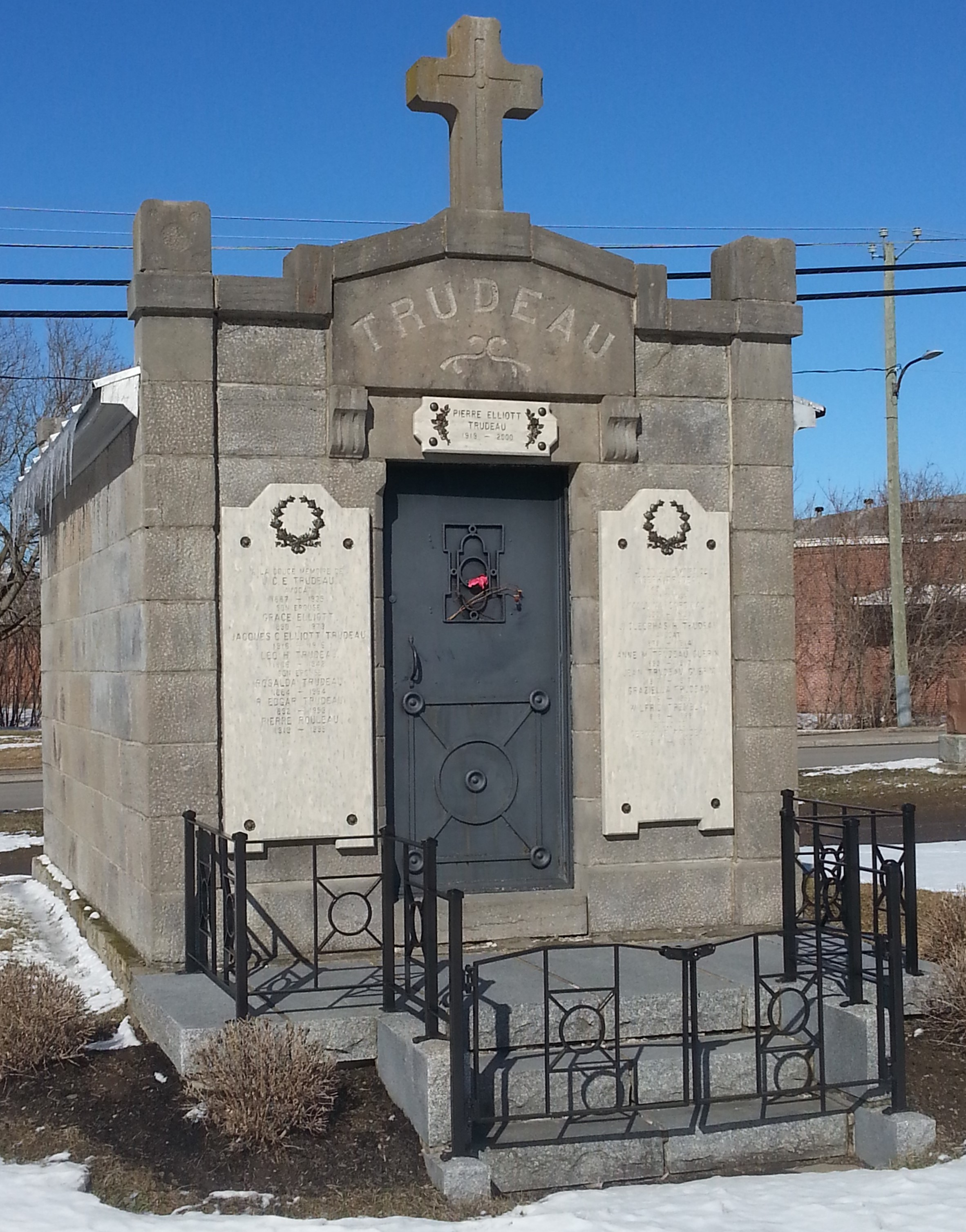
Trudeau family mausoleum

About 3,000 people gathered inside the Basilica for the service, including the Duke of York, then-Governor General Adrienne Clarkson, then-Prime Minister Jean Chrétien, and other Canadian leaders (including Trudeau's one-time rival Joe Clark). Former prime ministers John Turner and Brian Mulroney also attended. Foreign dignitaries included:

- Cuba: President Fidel Castro
- United Kingdom: Prince Andrew, Duke of York
- United States of America: former president Jimmy Carter
- Greece: President Konstantinos Stephanopoulos

Jimmy Carter, Fidel Castro, and the Aga Khan, were honorary pallbearers together with Leonard Cohen and Trudeau's cabinet colleague Marc Lalonde. Several thousand people congregated outside the Basilica to watch the funeral on giant screens.

As the casket entered the basilica, the choir sang J.S. Bach's "Jesu, Joy of Man's Desiring." Then the Archbishop of Montreal, Cardinal Jean-Claude Turcotte, gave the invocation. Sacha Trudeau gave a reading followed by Gounod's "Ave Maria".

After the readings, eulogies were delivered by Trudeau's friends Roy Heenan and former Senator Jacques Hébert; and then, memorably, by Trudeau's eldest son Justin, whose moving tribute to his father reduced many listeners to tears. Justin's eulogy, in English and French, concluded with the words, "Je t'aime, papa ("I love you, dad"), followed by spontaneous applause from the audience before he laid his head on his father's casket and wept.

After the service, which concluded with the singing of the national anthem, the casket was brought out of the Basilica and placed in the hearse for the trip to St-Rémi-de-Napierville Cemetery in Saint-Rémi, Quebec. Only Trudeau's immediate family was present when he was laid to rest in the Trudeau family mausoleum.

== Newsmaker of the Year ==
The overwhelming reaction to Trudeau's death was on the minds of many Canadian newspaper editors and it named Trudeau "Newsmaker of the Year" in the year 2000. It was the 10th time he received the honour by the Canadian news agency, Canadian Press (CP), surpassing his predecessor, Lester B. Pearson.

Like their father after he was named "Newsmaker of the 20th Century" a year earlier, the Trudeau sons declined to give interviews with the CP, but they said that they were "very honoured" by the choice.
