= Élie Mailloux =

Canadian politician

Member of the Legislative Assembly of Quebec for Témiscouata
- In office 1867–1875
- Succeeded by: Georges-Honoré Deschênes

Member of the Canada Parliament for Témiscouata
- In office March 5, 1873 – January 2, 1874
- Preceded by: Charles Bertrand
- Succeeded by: Jean-Baptiste Pouliot

Personal details
- Born: October 3, 1830 Cacouna, Lower Canada
- Died: July 3, 1893 (aged 62) Saint-Arsène, Quebec
- Party: Conservative
- Other political affiliations: Conservative Party of Quebec

Élie Mailloux (October 3, 1830 – July 3, 1893) was a farmer, clerk and political figure in Quebec, Canada. He represented Témiscouata in the Legislative Assembly of Quebec from 1867 to 1872 and in the House of Commons of Canada from 1872 to 1874 as a Conservative member.

He was born in Cacouna, Lower Canada, the son of Antoine Mailloux, and studied at the college in Sainte-Anne-de-la-Pocatière. In 1858, he married Apolline Dionne. Mailloux served as secretary-treasurer for Témiscouata County from 1865 to 1873 and for the communities of Viger and Saint-Arsène. He also served in the same post for the Saint-Arsène school board. In 1875, he was appointed registrar for Témiscouata County. He died in Saint-Arsène in 1893.
