= Napoléon Rioux =

Canadian politician

Member of the Legislative Assembly of Quebec for Témiscouata
- In office 1892–1897
- Preceded by: Charles-Eugène Pouliot
- Succeeded by: Félix-Alonzo Talbot

Personal details
- Born: February 13, 1837 Trois-Pistoles, Lower Canada
- Died: September 15, 1899 (aged 62) Trois-Pistoles, Quebec
- Party: Conservative

Napoléon Rioux (February 13, 1837 – September 15, 1899) was a seigneur, merchant and political figure in Quebec. He represented Témiscouata in the Legislative Assembly of Quebec from 1892 to 1897 as a Conservative.

He was born in Trois-Pistoles, Lower Canada, the son of Jean-Baptiste Rioux and Marcelline Chamberland, and was educated there. He owned the seigneury of Anse-aux-Coques. Rioux was a justice of the peace. In 1862, he married Philomène Martin. He helped found a colonization society at Trois-Pistoles in 1869. Rioux founded the local Saint-Jean-Baptiste Society in 1876 and also served as its president. He ran unsuccessfully for a seat in the Quebec assembly in 1890, losing to Charles-Eugène Pouliot, then defeated Pouliot to win the seat in 1892. Rioux was defeated by Félix-Alonzo Talbot when he ran for reelection in 1897. He died two years later in Trois-Pistoles at the age of 62.
