= Jeanne St. Laurent =

Canadian politician

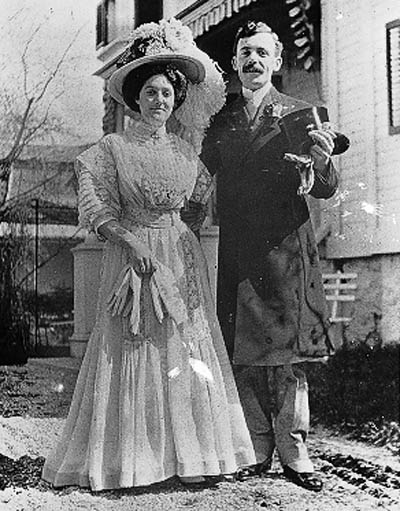
- St. Laurent during her wedding in 1908
- Born: Jeanne Renault; October 22, 1886; Beauceville, Quebec, Canada
- Died: November 14, 1966 (aged 80); Quebec City, Quebec, Canada
- Resting place: Saint Thomas d'Aquin Cemetery, Compton, Quebec, Canada
- Known for: Spouse of the Prime Minister of Canada
- Spouse: Louis St. Laurent (m. 1908)
- Children: 5

Jeanne St. Laurent (née Renault; October 22, 1886 – November 14, 1966) was the wife of Louis St. Laurent, the 12th Prime Minister of Canada.

== Biography ==
Renault was born in Beauceville, Quebec. Her parents were Pierre-Ferdinand Renault (1853–1912) and Amanda Montminy (1853–1922). Pierre-Ferdinand Renault was a Beauceville businessman (originally from Ste-Claire-de-Dorchester, Quebec) and changed his family name from Renaud.

Renault met Louis St. Laurent at a party in Quebec City in 1906 while he was working as a lawyer, and they married in 1908. They had five children together, two sons and three daughters. In 1951, she moved the family to Ottawa, after the government purchased an official prime-ministerial residence at 24 Sussex Drive. She would tour with her husband, but she refused to fly and never became reconciled to living in Ottawa.

== See also ==
- Spouse of the prime minister of Canada
