= Antoine Fréchette =

Canadian politician

Member of Parliament for Témiscouata
- In office March 1958 – June 1962
- Preceded by: Jean-Paul St. Laurent
- Succeeded by: Philippe Gagnon

Personal details
- Born: 22 August 1905 Saint-Alexandre, Quebec
- Died: 17 April 1978 (aged 72) N-D-Lac, Quebec
- Party: Progressive Conservative
- Profession: insurance agent, life insurance broker, life underwriter

Antoine Fréchette (22 August 1905 – 17 April 1978) was a Canadian businessman and politician. Fréchette was a Progressive Conservative party member of the House of Commons of Canada. Born in Saint-Alexandre, Quebec, he was an insurance agent, life insurance broker and life underwriter by career.

He was first elected at the Témiscouata riding in the 1958 general election after two previous unsuccessful attempts to win the riding in 1953 and 1957.

In 1959, Fréchette sponsored private member's bill C-21 which modified the Representation Act so that his Témiscouata electoral district was renamed Rivière-du-Loup—Témiscouata. After serving his only term, the 24th Canadian Parliament, he was defeated in the 1962 election in this renamed riding by Philippe Gagnon of the Social Credit party.
