= Jean-François Pouliot (politician) =

Canadian politician

The Hon. Jean-François Pouliot

Senator for De la Durantaye, Quebec
- In office July 28, 1955 – June 28, 1968
- Appointed by: Louis St. Laurent
- Preceded by: Fernand Fafard
- Succeeded by: Louis Giguère

Member of the Canadian Parliament for Témiscouata
- In office December 1, 1924 – July 27, 1955
- Preceded by: Charles Arthur Gauvreau
- Succeeded by: Jean-Paul St. Laurent

Personal details
- Born: March 27, 1890 Rivière-du-Loup, Quebec, Canada
- Died: July 6, 1969 (aged 79)
- Party: Liberal
- Relations: Charles-Eugène Pouliot, father Jean-Baptiste Pouliot, grandfather

Jean-François Pouliot (March 27, 1890 – July 6, 1969) was a lawyer, author and political figure in Quebec. He represented Témiscouata in the House of Commons of Canada from 1924 to 1955 as a Liberal and, for a period, as an Independent Liberal. Pouliot sat for De la Durantaye division in the Senate of Canada from 1955 to 1968.

He was born in Rivière-du-Loup, Quebec, the son of Charles-Eugène Pouliot and Stella-Anita Bertrand. Pouliot was admitted to the Quebec bar in 1914 and set up practice in Rivière-du-Loup. In 1920, he married Marika Maubach. He ran unsuccessfully for a seat in the House of Commons in 1921. Pouliot was elected in a 1924 by-election held following the death of Charles Arthur Gauvreau. He was re-elected in all subsequent federal elections, resigning his seat in 1955 after being called to the Senate.

Pouliot and several other Quebec Liberal MPs broke with the Liberal Party during the Conscription Crisis of 1944, quitting the Liberal caucus in order to oppose the government's decision to deploy National Resources Mobilization Act conscripts overseas. Previously, conscripts had only been used for "home defence" and kept within Canada. He ran and was re-elected as an "Independent Liberal" in the 1945 federal election. He subsequently rejoined the Liberal caucus.

He published:

- Le nouveau Code municipal annoté [de la province de Québec] (1916)
- Le droit paroissial de la province de Québec (1919)
- Traité de droit fabricien et paroissial (1936)

== Archives ==
There is a Jean-François Pouliot fonds at Library and Archives Canada.
