= Jean-Baptiste Pouliot =

Canadian politician

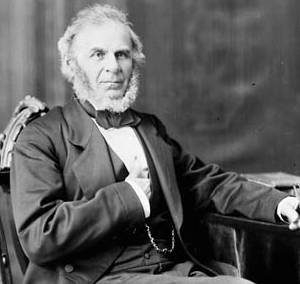
Jean-Baptiste Pouliot Source: Library and Archives Canada

Jean-Baptiste Pouliot (May 21, 1816 – October 18, 1888) was a Quebec notary and political figure. He represented Témiscouata in the House of Commons of Canada as a Liberal member from 1874 to 1878.

He was born at Kamouraska in 1816. He apprenticed as a notary at Rimouski, Trois-Pistoles and Kamouraska; he was admitted to the profession in 1840 and set up practice at Kamouraska, then La Malbaie and finally at Fraserville. Pouliot served on the municipal council at Fraserville. He was elected to the Legislative Assembly of the Province of Canada for Témiscouata in 1863; he opposed Confederation.

He died at Fraserville in 1888.

His son Charles-Eugène represented Témiscouata in the House of Commons and the Legislative Assembly of Quebec and his grandson Jean-François Pouliot later represented the same riding in the House of Commons and was later named to the Senate.

Parliament of Canada
Preceded by Élie Mailloux	Member of Parliament for Témiscouata; 1874–1878	Succeeded by Paul-Étienne Grandbois
