= Napoléon Dion =

Canadian politician

Member of the Legislative Assembly of Quebec for Témiscouata
- In office 1900–1912
- Preceded by: Félix-Alonzo Talbot
- Succeeded by: Luc Bérubé

Personal details
- Born: May 5, 1849 Trois-Pistoles, Canada East
- Died: February 4, 1919 (aged 69) Fraserville (Rivière-du-Loup), Quebec
- Party: Liberal

Napoléon Dion (May 5, 1849 – February 4, 1919) was a Canadian politician.

Born in Trois-Pistoles, Canada East, Dion was a member of the Municipal council of Fraserville (Rivière-du-Loup) from 1885 to 1889, in 1898, and in 1899. He was acclaimed to the Legislative Assembly of Quebec for Témiscouata in 1900. A Liberal, he was re-elected in 1904 and 1908. In 1912, he was appointed postmaster to the Parliament of Quebec, a post he served in until his death in Fraserville in 1919.
