= Rosaire Gendron =

Canadian politician (1920–1986)

- Official 1980 portrait

Mayor of Rivière-du-Loup
- In office 1956–1968

Member of Parliament for Rivière-du-Loup—Témiscouata
- In office 1963–1979
- Preceded by: Philippe Gagnon
- Succeeded by: riding dissolved

Member of Parliament for Kamouraska—Rivière-du-Loup
- In office 1979–1984
- Preceded by: riding created
- Succeeded by: André Plourde

Personal details
- Born: 19 October 1920 Saint-François-Xavier, Quebec
- Died: 5 July 1986 (aged 65)
- Party: Liberal
- Spouse(s): Marie Thibault m. 4 September 1948
- Profession: accountant

Rosaire Gendron (19 October 1920 – 5 July 1986) was a Liberal party member of the House of Commons of Canada. Born in Saint-François-Xavier, Quebec, he was a Chartered Accountant by career.

Gendron attended schools in Saint-François-Xavier, Sainte-Anne-de-la-Pocatiere, Saint-Victor, Lévis then Université Laval.

After an unsuccessful attempt to win the Rivière-du-Loup—Témiscouata electoral district in the 1962 federal election, he won that riding in the 1963 election. Gendron was re-elected in the 1965, 1972, 1974, 1979 and 1980 elections. He left federal politics after serving six terms from the 27th to the 32nd Canadian Parliaments.

Between 1956 and 1968 he was mayor of Rivière-du-Loup, Quebec, also serving as president of the Union of Quebec Municipalities in 1964–1965. He also served as executive vice-president for the Chamber of Commerce of Quebec at one time.
