= Témiscouata (federal electoral district) =

Former federal electoral district in Quebec, Canada

Quebec electoral district

Defunct federal electoral district
- Legislature: House of Commons
- District created: 1867
- District abolished: 1976
- First contested: 1867
- Last contested: 1974

Témiscouata (French pronunciation: [temiskwata]; also known as Rivière-du-Loup—Témiscouata) was a federal electoral district in Quebec, Canada, that was represented in the House of Commons of Canada from 1867 to 1979.

It was created as "Témiscouata" riding by the British North America Act, 1867. In 1959, it was renamed "Rivière-du-Loup—Témiscouata" and defined to consist of:

- the county of Témiscouata;
- the county of Rivière-du-Loup (except the parish municipalities of Notre-Dame-du-Portage and Sainte-Françoise and the municipalities of Saint-Jean-de-Dieu and Trois Pistoles) and the city of Rivière-du-Loup.

In 1966, it was redivided into the ridings of Kamouraska and Témiscouata. The new Témiscouata riding consisted of:

- the City of Rivière-du-Loup;
- the Towns of Cabano and Trois-Pistoles;
- the County of Rivière-du-Loup (except the parish municipalities of Notre-Dame-du-Portage and Saint-Antonin);
- parts of the County of Témiscouata; and
- parts of the County of Rimouski.

The riding was again renamed "Rivière-du-Loup—Témiscouata" in 1972.

Rivière-du-Loup—Témiscouata was abolished in 1976 when it was redistributed into the ridings of Kamouraska—Rivière-du-Loup and Rimouski.

== Members of Parliament ==
This riding elected the following members of Parliament:

Parliament	Years	Member	Party
Témiscouata
1st	1867–1872	Charles Bertrand	Conservative
2nd	1872–1874	Élie Mailloux	Conservative
3rd	1874–1878	Jean-Baptiste Pouliot	Liberal
4th	1878–1882	Paul-Étienne Grandbois	Conservative
5th	1882–1887	Paul-Étienne Grandbois	Conservative
6th	1887–1891	Paul-Étienne Grandbois	Conservative
7th	1891–1896	Paul-Étienne Grandbois	Conservative
8th	1896–1897	Charles-Eugène Pouliot	Liberal
8th	1897–1900	Charles Arthur Gauvreau	Liberal
9th	1900–1904	Charles Arthur Gauvreau	Liberal
10th	1904–1908	Charles Arthur Gauvreau	Liberal
11th	1908–1911	Charles Arthur Gauvreau	Liberal
12th	1911–1917	Charles Arthur Gauvreau	Liberal
13th	1917–1921	Charles Arthur Gauvreau	Opposition (Laurier Liberals)
14th	1921–1924	Charles Arthur Gauvreau	Liberal
14th	1924–1925	Jean-François Pouliot	Liberal
15th	1925–1926	Jean-François Pouliot	Liberal
16th	1926–1930	Jean-François Pouliot	Liberal
17th	1930–1935	Jean-François Pouliot	Liberal
18th	1935–1940	Jean-François Pouliot	Liberal
19th	1940–1944	Jean-François Pouliot	Liberal
19th	1944–1945	Jean-François Pouliot	Independent Liberal
20th	1945–1949	Jean-François Pouliot	Independent Liberal
21st	1949–1953	Jean-François Pouliot	Liberal
22nd	1953–1955	Jean-François Pouliot	Liberal
22nd	1955–1957	Jean-Paul St-Laurent	Liberal
23rd	1957–1958	Jean-Paul St-Laurent	Liberal
24th	1958–1962	Antoine Fréchette	Progressive Conservative
Rivière-du-Loup—Témiscouata
25th	1962–1963	Philippe Gagnon	Social Credit
26th	1963–1965	Rosaire Gendron	Liberal
27th	1965–1968	Rosaire Gendron	Liberal
Témiscouata
28th	1968–1972	Rosaire Gendron	Liberal
Rivière-du-Loup—Témiscouata
29th	1972–1974	Rosaire Gendron	Liberal
30th	1974–1979	Rosaire Gendron	Liberal
Riding dissolved into Kamouraska—Rivière-du-Loup and Rimouski

== Election results ==
=== Témiscouata, 1867–1962 ===
1867 Canadian federal election
Party	Candidate	Votes
Conservative	Charles Bertrand	acclaimed

1872 Canadian federal election
Party	Candidate	Votes
Conservative	Élie Mailloux	1,125
Conservative	Charles Bertrand	17
Liberal	Jean-Baptiste Pouliot	2

1874 Canadian federal election
Party	Candidate	Votes
Liberal	Jean-Baptiste Pouliot	acclaimed

1878 Canadian federal election
Party	Candidate	Votes
Conservative	Paul-Étienne Grandbois	1,079
Unknown	A. Pouliot	952

1882 Canadian federal election
Party	Candidate	Votes
Conservative	Paul-Étienne Grandbois	acclaimed

1887 Canadian federal election
Party	Candidate	Votes
Conservative	Paul-Étienne Grandbois	1,707
Liberal	Charles-Eugène Pouliot	1,641

1891 Canadian federal election
Party	Candidate	Votes
Conservative	Paul-Étienne Grandbois	1,813
Liberal	G.H. Deschênes	1,615

1896 Canadian federal election
Party	Candidate	Votes
Liberal	Charles-Eugène Pouliot	2,171
Conservative	Paul-Étienne Grandbois	1,604

By-election on 6 November 1897 On Pouliot's death, 24 June 1897
Party	Candidate	Votes
Liberal	Charles Arthur Gauvreau	acclaimed

1900 Canadian federal election
Party	Candidate	Votes
Liberal	Charles Arthur Gauvreau	2,212
Conservative	Paul-Étienne Grandbois	1,700

1904 Canadian federal election
Party	Candidate	Votes
Liberal	Charles Arthur Gauvreau	2,752
Conservative	Paul-Étienne Grandbois	1,800

1908 Canadian federal election
Party	Candidate	Votes
Liberal	Charles Arthur Gauvreau	3,027
Conservative	Luc Lebel	2,362

1911 Canadian federal election
Party	Candidate	Votes
Liberal	Charles Arthur Gauvreau	2,913
Conservative	Luc Lebel	2,701

1917 Canadian federal election
Party	Candidate	Votes
Opposition (Laurier Liberals)	Charles Arthur Gauvreau	6,489
Government (Unionist)	Luc Lebel	695

1921 Canadian federal election
Party	Candidate	Votes
Liberal	Charles Arthur Gauvreau	5,625
Independent	Jean-François Pouliot	4,833
Conservative	Nelson Caron	3,336

By-election on 1 December 1924 On Gauvreau's death, 9 October 1924
Party	Candidate	Votes
Liberal	Jean-François Pouliot	8,759
Liberal	Louis Eugène Parrot	5,544

1925 Canadian federal election
Party	Candidate	Votes
Liberal	Jean-François Pouliot	7,341
Conservative	Charles-Eugène Dubé	5,291

1926 Canadian federal election
Party	Candidate	Votes
Liberal	Jean-François Pouliot	8,431
Conservative	Charles-Eugène Dubé	6,513

1930 Canadian federal election
Party	Candidate	Votes
Liberal	Jean-François Pouliot	8,761
Conservative	Charles-Eugène Dubé	8,644

1935 Canadian federal election
Party	Candidate	Votes
Liberal	Jean-François Pouliot	10,177
Conservative	Luc Lebel	4,565
Reconstruction	Herbert H. Dickey	391

1940 Canadian federal election
Party	Candidate	Votes
Liberal	Jean-François Pouliot	9,615
National Government	Horace Cimon	2,063
Independent	Luc Lebel	1,518

1945 Canadian federal election
Party	Candidate	Votes
Independent Liberal	Jean-François Pouliot	10,325
Social Credit	Louis-Philippe Bouchard	1,907
Independent PC	Louis-Georges Seigneur	1,102

1949 Canadian federal election
Party	Candidate	Votes
Liberal	Jean-François Pouliot	11,648
Union des électeurs	Joseph-Antonio Mignault	2,756
Progressive Conservative	Luc Lebel	2,250

1953 Canadian federal election
Party	Candidate	Votes
Liberal	Jean-François Pouliot	10,675
Progressive Conservative	Antoine Fréchette	6,624
Independent Liberal	J.-A.-Paul Gravel	1,152

By-election on 26 September 1955 On Pouliot being called to the Senate, 28 July 1955
Party	Candidate	Votes
Liberal	Jean-Paul St. Laurent	12,010
Progressive Conservative	Jean-Paul Bérubé	8,055

1957 Canadian federal election
Party	Candidate	Votes
Liberal	Jean-Paul St. Laurent	11,558
Progressive Conservative	Antoine Fréchette	8,094

1958 Canadian federal election
Party	Candidate	Votes
Progressive Conservative	Antoine Fréchette	13,361
Liberal	Jean-Paul St. Laurent	9,810

=== Rivière-du-Loup—Témiscouata, 1962–1968 ===
1962 Canadian federal election
Party	Candidate	Votes
Social Credit	Philippe Gagnon	8,058
Liberal	Rosaire Gendron	7,959
Progressive Conservative	Antoine Fréchette	5,380

1963 Canadian federal election
Party	Candidate	Votes
Liberal	Rosaire Gendron	10,753
Social Credit	Philippe Gagnon	10,278
Progressive Conservative	Gilles Violette	1,246
New Democratic	Georges-Aurèle Pelletier	244

1965 Canadian federal election
Party	Candidate	Votes
Liberal	Rosaire Gendron	11,026
Ralliement créditiste	Charles-E. Landry	4,715
Progressive Conservative	Paul Lahaye	4,378
New Democratic	Daniel Lacroix	489

=== Témiscouata, 1968–1972 ===
1968 Canadian federal election
Party	Candidate	Votes
Liberal	Rosaire Gendron	10,605
Progressive Conservative	Antonio Dubé	8,630
Ralliement créditiste	Philippe Gagnon	3,029
New Democratic	Robert McLeod	360

=== Rivière-du-Loup—Témiscouata, 1972–1979 ===
1972 Canadian federal election
Party	Candidate	Votes
Liberal	Rosaire Gendron	10,004
Social Credit	Philippe Gagnon	9,659
Progressive Conservative	Marcel Dufour	5,263

1974 Canadian federal election
Party	Candidate	Votes
Liberal	Rosaire Gendron	11,071
Progressive Conservative	Gérard Lebel	9,128
Social Credit	Maurice Lemieux	3,261
Independent	Bernard Dumont	885
New Democratic	Patrice Vézina	708

== See also ==
- List of Canadian electoral districts
- Historical federal electoral districts of Canada
