= Louis St. Laurent =

Prime Minister of Canada from 1948 to 1957

The Right Honourable Louis St. Laurent PC CC QC
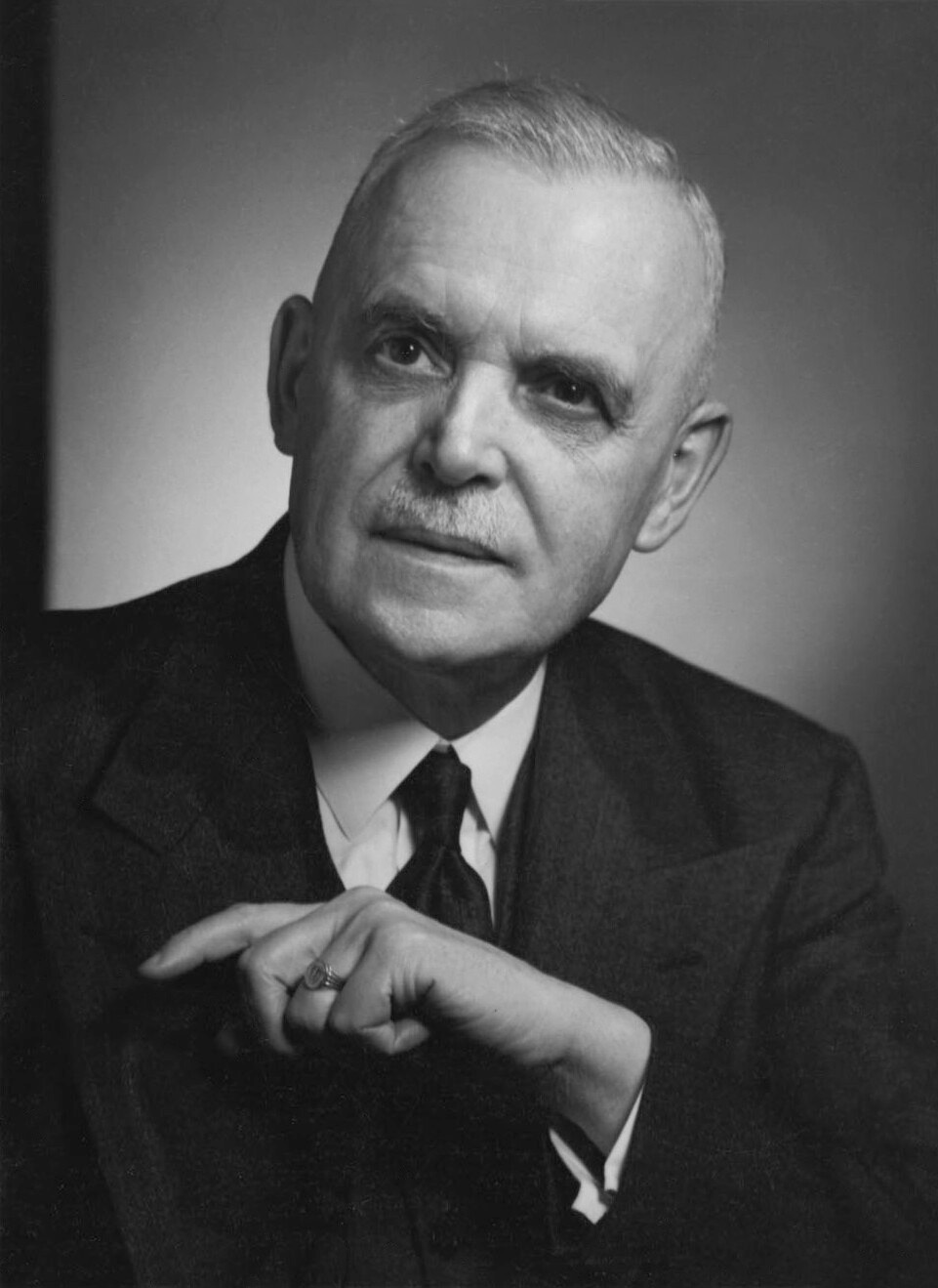
- St. Laurent, c. 1948

12th Prime Minister of Canada
- In office November 15, 1948 – June 21, 1957
- Monarchs: George VI; Elizabeth II
- Governors General: The Viscount Alexander of Tunis; Vincent Massey
- Preceded by: W. L. Mackenzie King
- Succeeded by: John Diefenbaker

Leader of the Opposition
- In office June 21, 1957 – January 16, 1958
- Preceded by: John Diefenbaker
- Succeeded by: Lester B. Pearson

Leader of the Liberal Party
- In office August 7, 1948 – January 16, 1958
- Preceded by: W. L. Mackenzie King
- Succeeded by: Lester B. Pearson
Ministerial positions
Minister of Justice Attorney General of Canada
In office September 10 – November 14, 1948; Acting: July 1 – September 9, 1948
Prime Minister	W. L. Mackenzie King
Preceded by	James Lorimer Ilsley
Succeeded by	Stuart Garson
In office December 10, 1941 – December 9, 1946
Prime Minister	W. L. Mackenzie King
Preceded by	Joseph-Enoil Michaud
Succeeded by	James Lorimer Ilsley
Secretary of State for External Affairs
In office September 4, 1946 – September 9, 1948
Prime Minister	W. L. Mackenzie King
Preceded by	W. L. Mackenzie King
Succeeded by	Lester B. Pearson

Member of Parliament for Quebec East
- In office February 9, 1942 – March 31, 1958
- Preceded by: Ernest Lapointe
- Succeeded by: Yvon-Roma Tassé

Personal details
- Born: Louis Stephen St-Laurent; February 1, 1882 Compton, Quebec, Canada
- Died: July 25, 1973 (aged 91) Quebec City, Quebec, Canada
- Resting place: Saint Thomas d'Aquin Cemetery, Compton, Quebec
- Party: Liberal
- Spouse: Jeanne Renault (m. 1908; died 1966)
- Children: 5, including Jean-Paul
- Education: Séminaire Saint-Charles-Borromée; Université Laval
- Profession: Lawyer

Louis Stephen St. Laurent (French: [lwi sɛ̃ lɔʁɑ̃]; February 1, 1882 – July 25, 1973) was a Canadian lawyer and politician who served as the 12th prime minister of Canada from 1948 to 1957.

Born in Compton, Quebec, St. Laurent was a prominent lawyer and supporter of the Liberal Party of Canada. In 1941, he entered politics as minister of justice under Prime Minister William Lyon Mackenzie King, and in 1942 he won a by-election in the riding of Quebec East. In 1946, St. Laurent became secretary of state for external affairs and served in that post until two years later, when he became leader of the Liberal Party and prime minister, succeeding King who had retired. St. Laurent led the party to back-to-back landslide majority governments in the federal elections of 1949 and 1953.

The second French Canadian prime minister after Wilfrid Laurier, St. Laurent expanded the Canadian welfare state by introducing equalization payments, the registered retirement savings plan (RRSP), and the Hospital Insurance program—the last being an early form of Medicare. His government also initiated major public works projects, including the Trans-Canada Highway, the St. Lawrence Seaway, the Canso Causeway, and the Trans-Canada Pipeline. In 1953, his government authorized the High Arctic relocation, which resulted in the forced displacement of 92 Inuit to modern-day Nunavut. In foreign policy, St. Laurent's government oversaw Canada's entry to the North Atlantic Treaty Organization (NATO) and committed the third largest overall contribution of troops, ships, and aircraft to the Korean War. In 1956, St. Laurent's secretary of state for external affairs, Lester B. Pearson, helped resolve the Suez Crisis by proposing the United Nations Emergency Force (UNEF), for which Pearson received the 1957 Nobel Peace Prize.

St. Laurent earned the nickname "Uncle Louis" as he was popular among the general public throughout his tenure, and the popularity of his government led many to predict that he would easily win the 1957 federal election. However, his decision to rush the 1956 Trans-Canada Pipeline debate by invoking closure led to the perception that the Liberals had become arrogant from their two decades in power. In an upset, the party was narrowly defeated by John Diefenbaker's Progressive Conservatives, ending nearly 22 years of Liberal rule. After his defeat, St. Laurent retired from politics and returned to his law practice. He is ranked highly in rankings of Canadian prime ministers. According to historian Donald Creighton, St. Laurent was "eminently moderate, cautious...and a strong Canadian nationalist."

== Early life, family, and education (1882–1905) ==
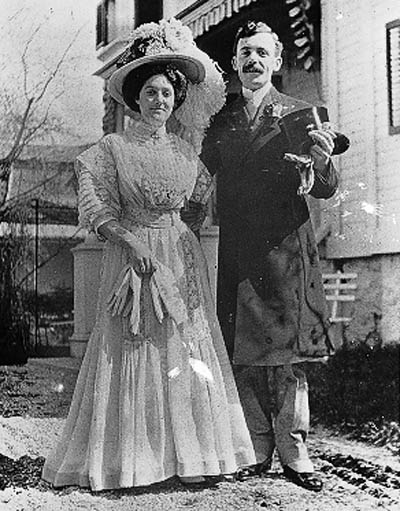
Louis and Jeanne on their wedding day, May 19, 1908

Louis St. Laurent (French pronunciation: [lwi sɛ̃ lɔʁɑ̃]) was born on February 1, 1882, in Compton, Quebec, a village in the Eastern Townships, to Jean-Baptiste-Moïse Saint-Laurent, a French Canadian, and Mary Anne Broderick, an Irish Canadian. Louis was the oldest of seven children. At the time of his birth, Compton was mainly English-speaking, though it would slowly become majority French between 1901 and 1911. St. Laurent grew up fluently bilingual, as his father spoke French while his mother only spoke English. His English had a noticeable Irish brogue, while his gestures (such as a hunch of the shoulders) were French. St. Laurent was also interested in English literature as a child. The St. Laurent home would serve as a social centre for the village.

St. Laurent's father, Jean-Baptiste, was a Compton shopkeeper and a staunch supporter of the Liberal Party of Canada and Sir Wilfrid Laurier. Jean-Baptiste would unsuccessfully run in a provincial by-election in 1894. When Laurier led the Liberals to victory in the 1896 election, 14-year-old Louis relayed the election returns from the telephone in his father's store.

St. Laurent received degrees from Séminaire Saint-Charles-Borromée (B.A. 1902) and Université Laval (LL.L. 1905). He was offered, but declined, a Rhodes Scholarship upon this graduation from Laval in 1905. In 1908, he married Jeanne Renault (1886–1966), with whom he had two sons and three daughters, including Jean-Paul St. Laurent.

== Legal career (1905–1942) ==
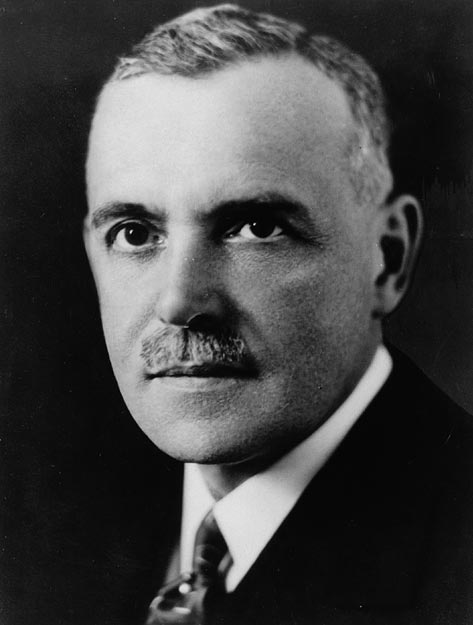
St. Laurent as a lawyer, 1936

St. Laurent worked as a lawyer from 1905 to 1942. He also became a professor of law at Université Laval in 1914. St. Laurent practised corporate, commercial and constitutional law in Quebec and became one of the country's most respected counsel. St. Laurent served as president of the Canadian Bar Association from 1930 to 1932.

In 1907, St. Laurent gained some attention in Quebec after he made a move that was viewed unusual at the time: he put a priest and nuns on the witness stand and cross-examined them. This occurred during his engagement in a case contesting the will of a woman who had left everything she owned to her parish priest. In 1912, St. Laurent won a case against Canadian Pacific. In 1913, he was one of the defending counsel for Harry Kendall Thaw, who was seeking to avoid extradition from Quebec. In 1923, St. Laurent opened his own law office. In 1926, in a test case before the Supreme Court, St. Laurent argued for religious minority (non-Christian) rights. He was in favour of Jewish demand for representation on Montreal's Protestant Board of School Commissioners and he also supported a separate Jewish system of schools. Though St. Laurent's bid to have Jewish representation in the school board was unsuccessful, the province of Quebec recognized the right to establish separate schools for non-Christians.

Though an ardent Liberal, Louis remained aloof from active politics for much of his life, focusing instead on his legal career and family. He became one of Quebec's leading lawyers and was so highly regarded that he was twice offered a seat as a justice on the Supreme Court of Canada, offers he declined.

== Cabinet minister (1942–1948) ==
=== Minister of Justice ===
It was not until he was nearly 60 that St. Laurent finally agreed to enter politics when Liberal Prime Minister William Lyon Mackenzie King appealed to his sense of duty in late 1941. King's Quebec lieutenant, Ernest Lapointe, had died in November 1941. King believed that his Quebec lieutenant had to be strong enough and respected enough to help deal with the volatile conscription issue. King had been a junior politician when he witnessed the Conscription Crisis of 1917 during World War I and wanted to prevent the same divisions from threatening his government. Many recommended St. Laurent for the post. On these recommendations, King recruited St. Laurent to cabinet as Minister of Justice, Lapointe's former post, on 9 December. St. Laurent agreed to go to Ottawa out of a sense of duty, but only on the understanding that his foray into politics was temporary and that he would return to Quebec at the conclusion of the war. In February 1942, he won a by-election for Quebec East, Lapointe's former riding, which had been previously held by Laurier. St. Laurent supported King's decision to introduce conscription in 1944 (see Conscription Crisis of 1944). His support prevented more than a handful of Quebec Liberal Members of Parliament (MPs) from leaving the party and was therefore crucial to keeping the government and the party united. St. Laurent was King's right-hand man.

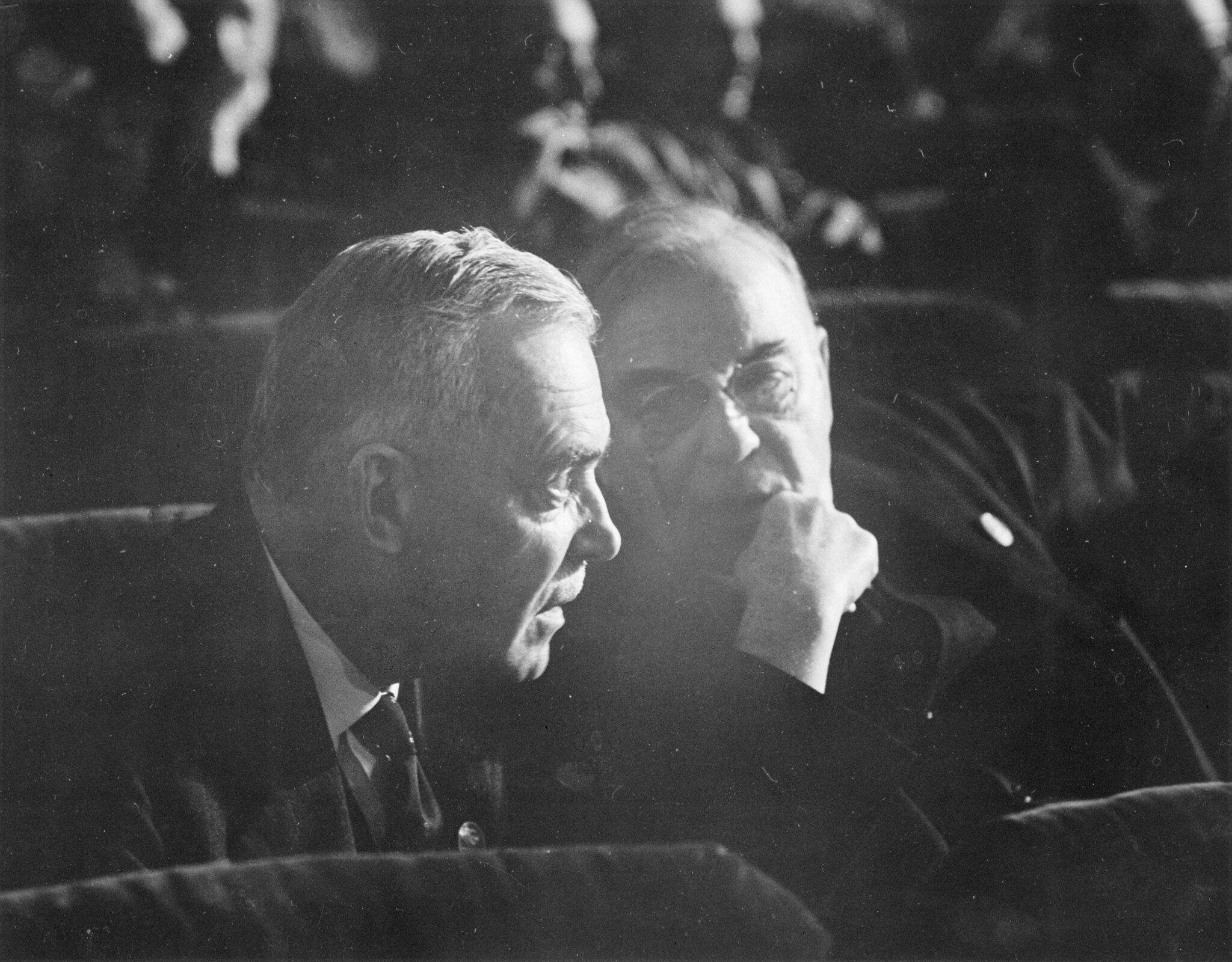
St. Laurent (left) and Prime Minister King (right) at the San Francisco Conference, May 1945

St. Laurent represented Canada at the 1945 San Francisco Conference that helped lead to the founding of the United Nations (UN).

In 1944, St. Laurent oversaw the creation of family allowances. In 1945, St. Laurent supported a program of economic reconstruction and more social welfare, which consisted of federal-provincial cost-sharing schemes for old-age pensions and hospital and medical insurance. Some officials were worried that these sweeping changes would cause disputes between the federal and provincial governments, but St. Laurent believed that Canadians identified with and supported these programs, stating that "[they] were constantly made aware of the services which provincial governments render while they tended to think of the central government as one imposing burdens such as taxation and conscription."

In September 1945, Soviet cipher clerk Igor Gouzenko unexpectedly arrived at St. Laurent's office with evidence of a Soviet spy ring operating in Canada, the United States, and the United Kingdom. Known as the Gouzenko Affair, the revelations and subsequent investigations over the following few years showed major Soviet espionage in North America.

=== Minister of external affairs ===
King came to regard St. Laurent as his most trusted minister and natural successor. He persuaded St. Laurent that it was his duty to remain in government following the war in order to help with the construction of a post-war international order and promoted him to the position of secretary of state for external affairs (foreign minister) in 1946, a portfolio King had always kept for himself.

In February 1947, St. Laurent delivered a speech at the University of Toronto describing "the foundations of Canadian policy in world affairs", which Canadian former diplomat Peter Boehm described in 2026 as having "set out the parameters of the rules-based international order". The principles he described in the speech included "respect for the rule of law" and a Canadian “willingness to accept international responsibilities.”

==== United Nations ====
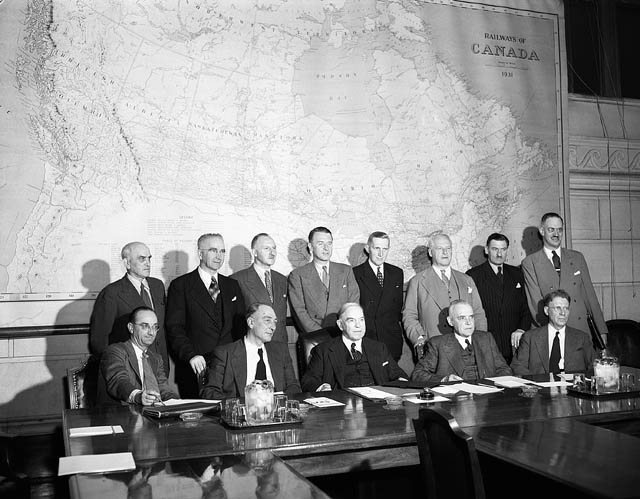
St. Laurent (bottom, centre-right) and King (bottom, centre) and other delegates negotiating the entry of Newfoundland and Labrador into Confederation, 1947

St. Laurent, compelled by his belief that the UN would be ineffective in times of war and armed conflict without some military means to impose its will, advocated the adoption of a UN military force. This force he proposed would be used in situations that called for both tact and might to preserve peace or prevent combat. In 1956, this idea was actualized by St. Laurent and his secretary of state for external affairs, Lester B. Pearson, in the development of UN peacekeepers that helped to put an end to the Suez Crisis.

St. Laurent also believed that the UN was failing to provide international security from communism from the Soviet Union. He therefore proposed an Atlantic security organization that would supplement the UN. That would become reality in 1949, when the North Atlantic Treaty Organization (NATO) was founded. St. Laurent is seen as one of the first people in power to propose such an institution.

==== Newfoundland joins the Confederation ====
St. Laurent was a strong supporter of the Dominion of Newfoundland joining Canada. He ignored objections from the government of Quebec, which had land claims against Newfoundland and demanded a right of veto over the admission of any new province or territory. St. Laurent led two negotiations with Newfoundland and Joey Smallwood in the summer of 1947 and the fall of 1948. These negotiations were successful, and on March 31, 1949, Newfoundland became the tenth province of Canada, with St. Laurent presiding over the ceremonies in Ottawa as prime minister.

=== 1948 Liberal Party leadership convention ===
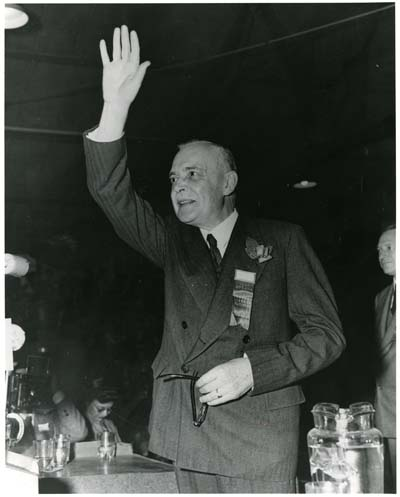
Louis St. Laurent, August 7, 1948

In 1948, MacKenzie King retired after over 21 years in power, and quietly persuaded his senior ministers to support St. Laurent's selection as the new Liberal leader at the Liberal leadership convention that took place on August 7, 1948, exactly 29 years after King became leader. St. Laurent easily won, defeating two other opponents.

== Prime Minister (1948–1957) ==
St. Laurent was sworn in as prime minister of Canada on 15 November 1948, making him Canada's second French Canadian prime minister, after Wilfrid Laurier.

St. Laurent was the first prime minister to live in the official residence of the Prime Minister of Canada, 24 Sussex Drive (then known as 24 Sussex Street), from 1951 to 1957.

=== Federal election victories ===
==== 1949 federal election ====
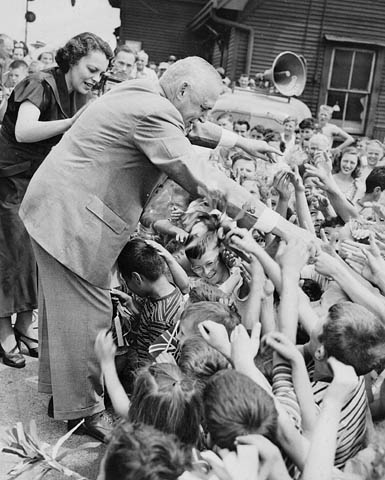
St. Laurent shaking hands with supporters during the 1949 election campaign

St. Laurent's first mission was to give the Liberals a new mandate. In the 1949 federal election that followed his ascension to the Liberal leadership, many wondered, including Liberal Party insiders, if St. Laurent would appeal to the post-war populace of Canada. On the campaign trail, St. Laurent's image was developed into somewhat of a 'character' and what is considered to be the first 'media image' to be used in Canadian politics. St. Laurent chatted with children, gave speeches in his shirt sleeves, and had a 'common touch' that turned out to be appealing to voters. At one event during the 1949 election campaign, he disembarked his train and instead of approaching the assembled crowd of adults and reporters, gravitated to, and began chatting with, a group of children on the platform. A reporter submitted an article entitled "Uncle Louis can't lose!" which earned him the nickname "Uncle Louis" in the media ("Papa Louis" in Quebec). With this common touch and broad appeal, he led the party to victory in the election against the Progressive Conservative Party (PC Party) led by George Drew. The Liberals won 191 seats – the most in Canadian history at the time, and still a record for the party. This is also the Liberals' second-most successful result in their history in terms of proportion of seats, behind the 1940 federal election.

==== 1953 federal election ====
St. Laurent led the Liberals to another powerful majority in the 1953 federal election, once again defeating PC leader Drew. Though they lost 22 seats, they still had three dozen seats more than the number needed for a majority, enabling them to dominate the House of Commons.

=== Foreign policy ===
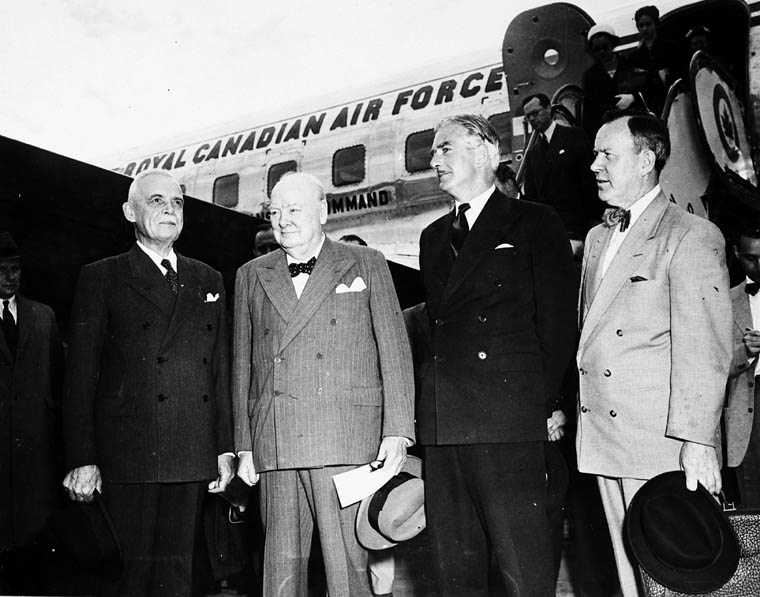
Canadian prime minister St. Laurent (far left), British prime minister Winston Churchill (left), British foreign minister Anthony Eden (right), and Canadian foreign minister Lester Pearson (far right) in Ottawa in 1954

St. Laurent and his cabinet oversaw Canada's expanding international role in the postwar world. His stated desire was for Canada to occupy a social, military, and economic middle power role in the post-World War II world. In 1947, he identified the five basic principles of Canadian foreign policy and five practical applications regarding Canada's international relations. Always highly sensitive to cleavages of language, religion, and region, he stressed national unity, insisting, "that our external policies shall not destroy our unity ... for a disunited Canada will be a powerless one." He also stressed political liberty and rule of law in the sense of opposition to totalitarianism.

Militarily, St. Laurent was a leading proponent of the establishment of the North Atlantic Treaty Organization (NATO) in 1949, serving as an architect and signatory of the treaty document. Involvement in such an organization marked a departure from King who had been reticent about joining a military alliance. Under his leadership, Canada supported the United Nations (UN) in the Korean War and committed the third largest overall contribution of troops, ships and aircraft to the U.N. forces to the conflict. Troops to Korea were selected on a voluntary basis. St. Laurent sent over 26,000 troops to fight in the war. In 1956, under his direction, St. Laurent's secretary of state for external affairs, Lester B. Pearson, helped solve the Suez Crisis between Great Britain, France, Israel and Egypt, bringing forward St. Laurent's 1946 views on a U.N. military force in the form of the United Nations Emergency Force (UNEF) or peacekeeping. These actions were recognized when Pearson won the 1957 Nobel Peace Prize.

In early 1954, St. Laurent took a 42-day long tour around the world, citing his desire to get a better picture of what he said, "the problems which all of us have to face together." He visited 12 countries in total, including France, Germany, Japan, India, and Pakistan. When he returned to Canada, St. Laurent's personality and character appeared to slightly change; cabinet ministers noticed he showed signs of fatigue and indifference. Some even claimed he started to feel depressed. Author Dale C. Thomson wrote, "[the tour was] his greatest hour but it marked as well the beginning of his decline; as such, it was a turning point both for him and for Canadian politics."

=== Social and economic policies ===
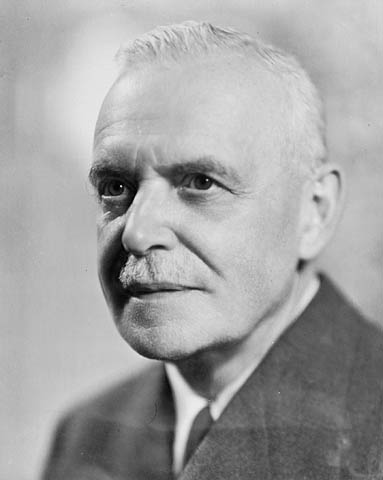
St. Laurent, 1950

It took taxation surpluses no longer needed by the wartime military and paying back in full Canada's debts accrued during the World Wars and the Great Depression. With remaining revenues, St. Laurent oversaw the expansion of Canada's social programs, including the gradual expansion of social welfare programs such as family allowances, old age pensions, government funding of university and post-secondary education and an early form of Medicare termed Hospital Insurance at the time. This scheme laid the groundwork for Tommy Douglas' healthcare system in Saskatchewan, and Pearson's nationwide universal healthcare in the late 1960s. Under this legislation, the federal government paid around 50% of the cost of provincial health plans to cover "a basic range of inpatient services in acute, convalescent, and chronic hospital care." The condition for the cost-sharing agreements was that all citizens were to be entitled to these benefits, and by March 1963, 98.8% of Canadians were covered by Hospital Insurance. According to historian Katherine Boothe, however, St. Laurent did not regard government health insurance to be a "good policy idea", instead favouring the expansion of voluntary insurance through existing plans. In 1951, for instance, St. Laurent spoke in support of the medical profession assuming "the administration and responsibility for, a scheme that would provide prepaid medical attendance to any Canadian who needed it".

In addition, St. Laurent modernized and established new social and industrial policies for the country during his time in the prime minister's office. Amongst these measures included the universalization of old-age pensions for all Canadians aged seventy and above (1951), the introduction of old age assistance for needy Canadians aged sixty-five and above (1951), the introduction of allowances for the blind (1951) and the disabled (1954), amendments to unemployment insurance in 1953 (which provided for the payment of unemployment insurance benefit to insured persons incapacitated for work due to injury or illness), amendments to the National Housing Act (1954) which provided federal government financing to non-profit organisations as well as the provinces for the renovation or construction of hostels or housing for students, the disabled, the elderly, and families on low incomes, and unemployment assistance (1956) for unemployed employables on welfare who had exhausted (or did not qualify for) unemployment insurance benefits. Aid to farmers adversely affected by crop failures was improved, while grants to universities were doubled.

In 1954 a government scheme for insuring fishing vessels was established, while the following year a Fisheries Improvement Loan Act was introduced under which government guaranteed loans at 5% were provided to fishermen via the chartered banks. That same year a Women's Bureau was set up to work on projects aimed at improving the position of female workers. In 1956, equal pay was introduced in the federal civil service. In 1955 a measure was introduced aimed at maintaining gold mine employment in communities depending on this industry, and in 1956 a Family Assistance Program to help immigrant families with child expenses was introduced. Improvements were also made in benefits for veterans and their dependents. Discrimination was also banned by the 1953 Fair Employment Practices Act and in 1957 unemployment insurance was extended to fishermen. Improvements were also made in superannuation arrangements.

St. Laurent's government also used $100 million in death taxes to establish the Canada Council to support research in the arts, humanities, and social sciences. In 1956, using the taxation authority of the federal level of government, St. Laurent's government introduced the policy of "equalization payments" which redistributes taxation revenues between provinces to assist the poorer provinces in delivering government programs and services, a move that has been considered a strong one in solidifying the Canadian federation, particularly with his home province of Québec.

In 1957, St. Laurent's government introduced the registered retirement savings plan (RRSP), a type of financial account used to hold savings and investment assets. The plan had many tax advantages and was designed to promote savings for retirement by employees and self-employed people.

=== Immigration ===
In 1948, St. Laurent's government dramatically increased immigration in order to expand Canada's labour base. St. Laurent believed that immigration was key to post-war economic growth. He also believed that immigration would create a sufficient tax base that would pay for social welfare measures that were established at the end of World War II. Over 125,000 immigrants arrived in Canada in 1948 alone, and that number would more than double to 282,000 in 1957. Large numbers of immigrants were from Southern Europe, including Italians, Greeks, and Portuguese immigrants. Their arrival shifted the balance of ethnic origins amongst Canadians, increasing the population who were of neither French nor British descent.

In 1956 and 1957, Canada received over 37,500 refugees from Hungary, in the wake of the 1956 Hungarian Revolution.

=== Infrastructure ===
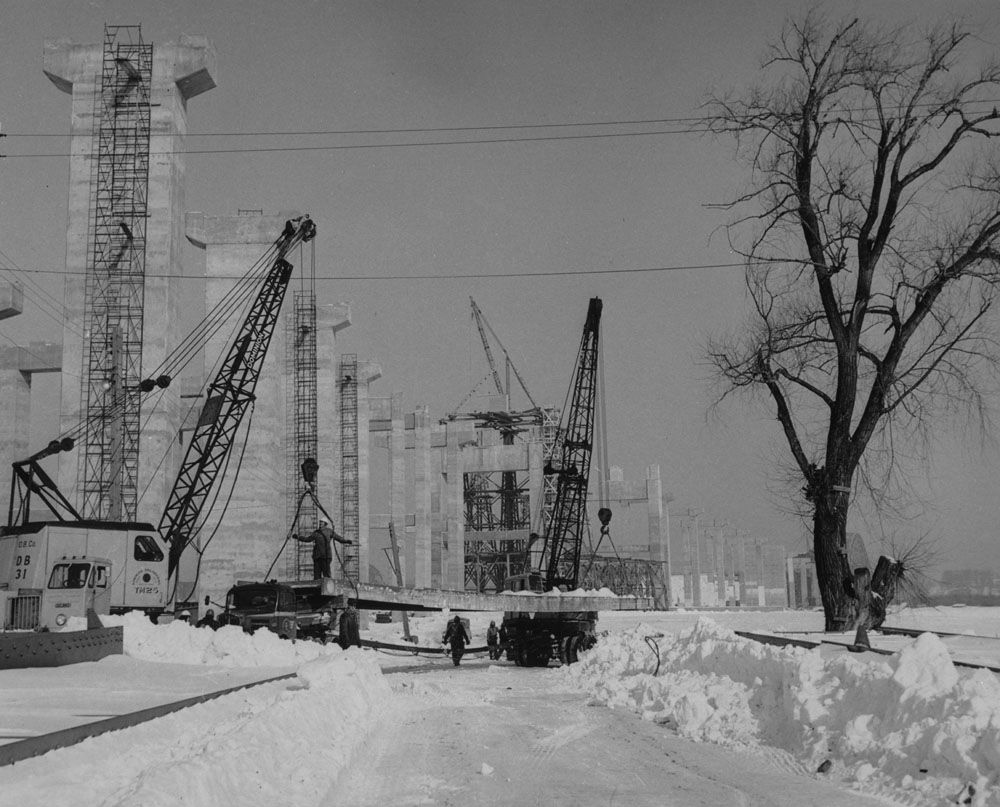
The construction of the St. Lawrence Seaway in 1959

St. Laurent's government engaged in massive public works and infrastructure projects such as building the Trans-Canada Highway (1949), the St. Lawrence Seaway (1954) and the Trans-Canada Pipeline. It was this last project that was to sow the seeds that led to the downfall of the St. Laurent government.

St. Laurent had to go through a series of negotiations with the United States in order to start the construction of the St. Lawrence Seaway. In order to negotiate with the U.S., St. Laurent met with president Harry S. Truman twice, in 1949 and 1951, but was unsuccessful both times. St. Laurent then threatened that Canada would build the seaway alone. Finally, in 1953 and 1954, Truman's successor, president Dwight Eisenhower, secured a deal with St. Laurent. The deal cost $470 million Canadian dollars, with Canada paying nearly three-fourths of that total and the U.S. paying about one-fourth. The seaway was completed in 1959 and expanded Canada's economic trade routes with the United States.

=== Other domestic affairs ===
In 1949, the former lawyer of many Supreme Court cases, St. Laurent ended the practice of appealing Canadian legal cases to the Judicial Committee of the Privy Council of Great Britain, making the Supreme Court of Canada the highest avenue of legal appeal available to Canadians. In that same year, St. Laurent negotiated the British North America (No. 2) Act, 1949 with Britain which 'partially patriated' the Canadian Constitution, most significantly giving the Canadian Parliament the authority to amend portions of the constitution.

In 1949, following two referendums within the province, St. Laurent and Premier Joey Smallwood negotiated the entry of Newfoundland and Labrador into Confederation.

When asked in 1949 whether he would outlaw the Communist Party in Canada, St. Laurent responded that the party posed little threat and that such measures would be drastic.

In 1952, St. Laurent advised Queen Elizabeth II to appoint Vincent Massey as the first Canadian-born Governor-General. Each of the aforementioned actions were and are seen as significant in furthering the cause of Canadian autonomy from Britain and developing a national identity on the international stage.

In 1953, St. Laurent undertook the High Arctic relocation, where 92 Inuit were moved from Inukjuak, Quebec to two communities in the Northwest Territories (now Nunavut). The relocation was a forced migration instigated by the federal government to assert its sovereignty in the Far North by the use of "human flagpoles", in light of both the Cold War and the disputed territorial claims to the Canadian Arctic Archipelago. The relocated Inuit were not given sufficient support to prevent extreme privation during their first years after the move. The story was the subject of a book called The Long Exile, published by Melanie McGrath in 2006.

=== Defeat in the 1957 federal election ===
==== Pipeline Debate ====
The 1956 Pipeline Debate led to the widespread impression that the Liberals had grown arrogant in power. On numerous occasions, the government invoked closure in order to curtail debate and ensure that its Pipeline Bill passed by a specific deadline. St. Laurent was criticized for a lack of restraint exercised on his minister, C. D. Howe (who was also known as the "Minister of Everything"). Howe was widely perceived as extremely arrogant. Western Canadians felt particularly alienated by the government, believing that the Liberals were kowtowing to interests in Ontario and Quebec and the United States. The opposition accused the government of accepting overly costly contracts that could never be completed on schedule. In the end, the pipeline was completed early and under budget. The pipeline conflict turned out to be meaningless, insofar as the construction work was concerned, since pipe could not be obtained in 1956 from a striking American factory, and no work could have been done that year. The uproar in Parliament regarding the pipeline had a lasting impression on the electorate, and was a decisive factor in the Liberal government's 1957 defeat at the hands of the Progressive Conservative (PC) Party, led by John Diefenbaker, in the 1957 election.

==== Results ====
By 1957 St. Laurent was 75 years old and tired. His party had been in power for 22 years, and by this time had accumulated too many factions and alienated too many groups. He was ready to retire, but was persuaded to fight one last campaign. In the 1957 election, the Liberals won 200,000 more votes nationwide than the Progressive Conservatives (40.75% Liberals to 38.81% PC). However, a large portion of that overall Liberal popular vote came from huge majorities in Quebec ridings, and did not translate into seats in other parts of the country. Largely due to dominating the rest of the country, the Progressive Conservatives took the greatest number of seats with 112 seats (42% of the House) to the Liberals' 105 (39.2%). The result of the election came as a shock to many, and is considered to be one of the greatest upsets in Canadian federal political history.

Some ministers wanted St. Laurent to stay on and offer to form a minority government, arguing that the popular vote had supported them and the party's long years of experience would make them a more effective minority. Another option circulated within the party saw the balance of power to be held by either the Co-operative Commonwealth Federation (CCF) and their 25 seats or Social Credit Party of Canada with their 15 seats. St. Laurent was encouraged by others to reach out to the CCF and at least four of six independent/small party MPs to form a coalition majority government, which would have held 134 of the 265 seats in Parliament—50.6% of the total. St. Laurent, however, had no desire to stay in office; he believed that the nation had passed a verdict against his government and his party. In any case, the CCF and Socreds had pledged to cooperate with a Tory government. It was very likely that St. Laurent would have been defeated on the floor of the House had he tried to stay in power with a minority government, and would not have stayed in office for long even if he survived that confidence vote. With this in mind, St. Laurent resigned on 21 June 1957—ending the longest uninterrupted run in government for a party at the federal level in Canadian history.

== Supreme Court appointments ==
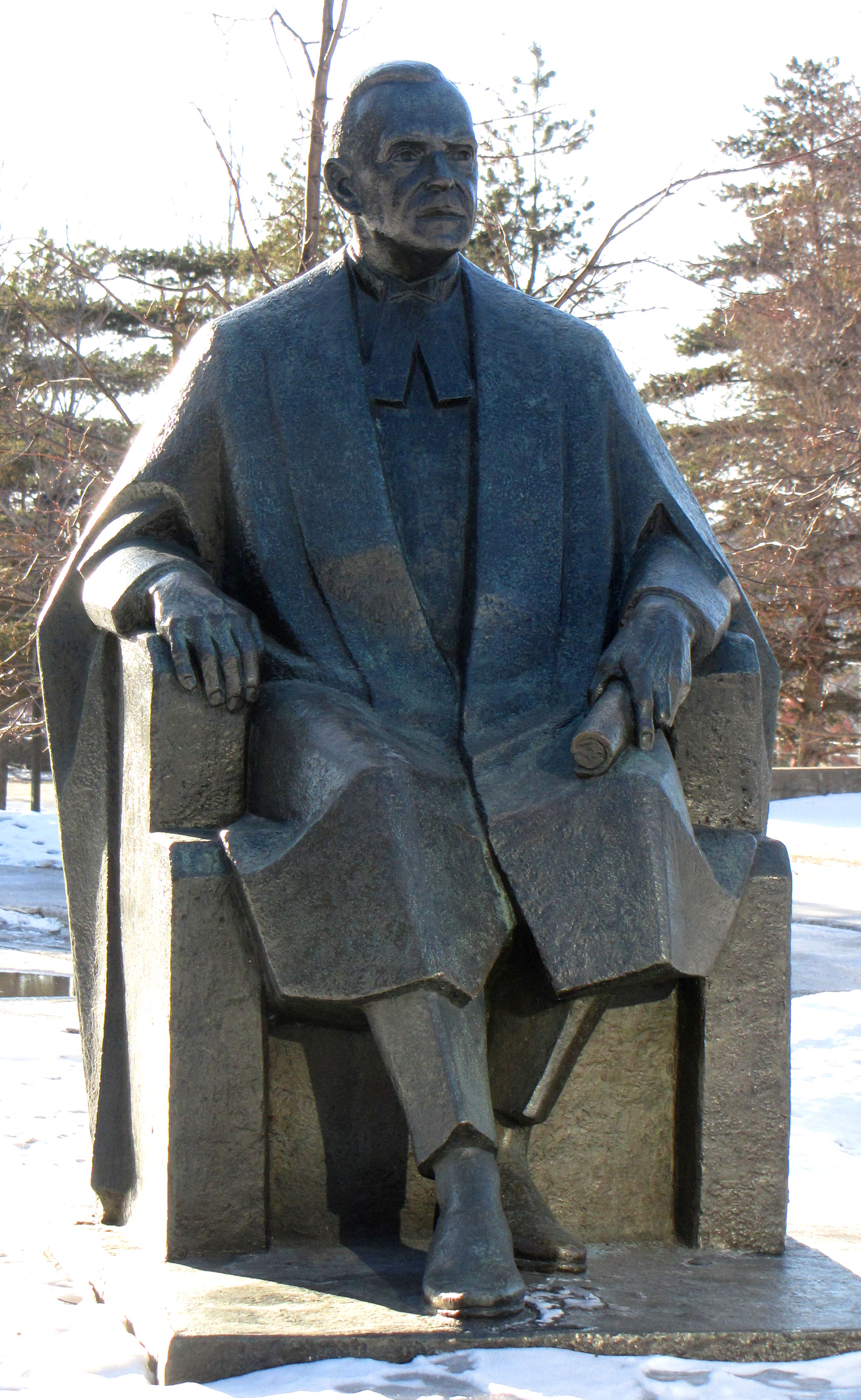
Statue on grounds of the Supreme Court of Canada

St. Laurent chose the following jurists to be appointed as justices of the Supreme Court of Canada by the Governor General:

- John Robert Cartwright (22 December 1949 – 23 March 1970)
- Joseph Honoré Gérald Fauteux (22 December 1949 – 23 December 1973)
- Douglas Charles Abbott (1 July 1954 – 23 December 1973)
- Patrick Kerwin (as Chief Justice, 1 July 1954 – 2 February 1963; appointed a Puisne Justice under Prime Minister Richard Bennett, 20 July 1935)
- Henry Grattan Nolan (1 March 1956 – 8 July 1957)

== Retirement and death (1957–1973) ==
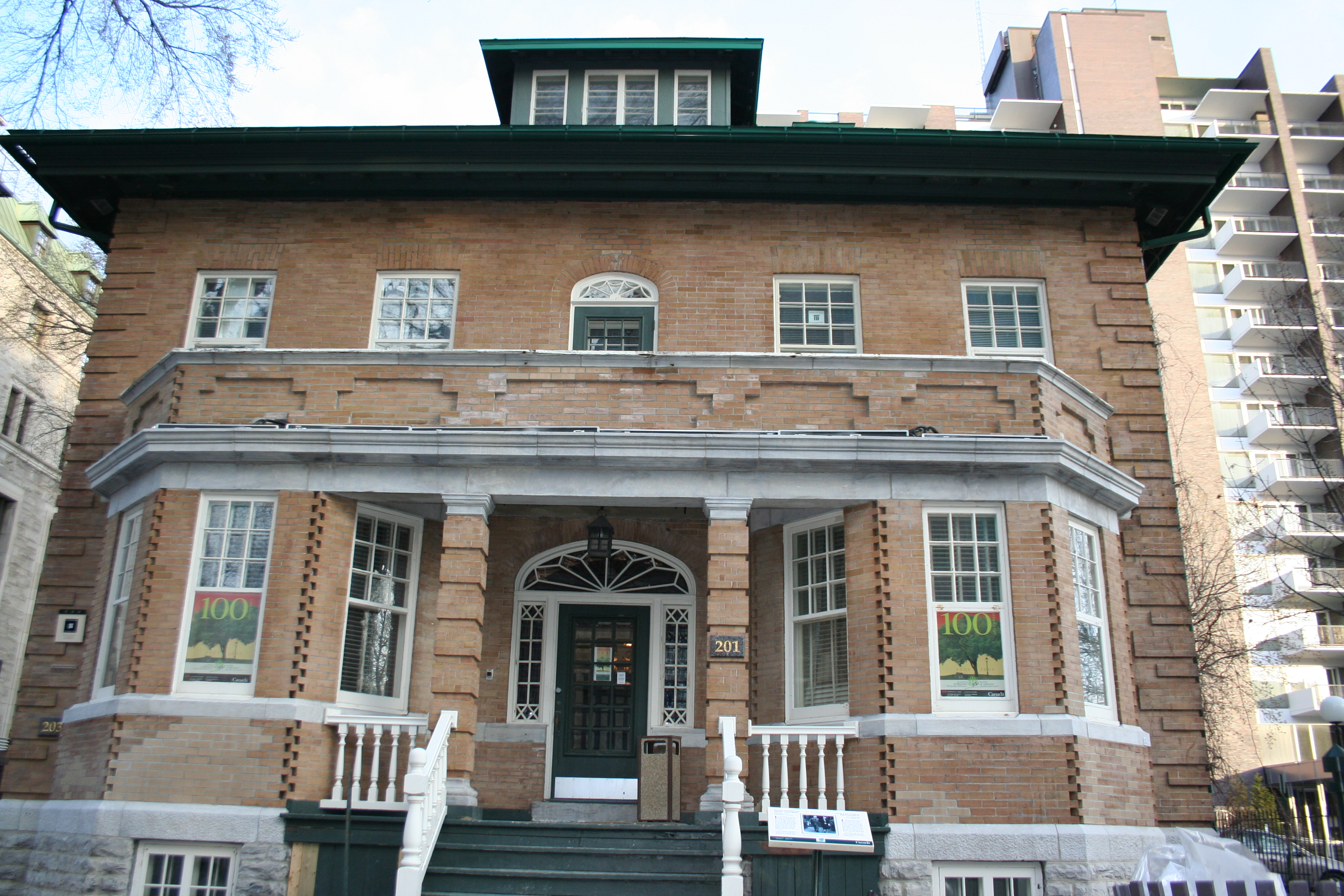
201 Grande-Allée, residence of St. Laurent in Quebec City for sixty years

After a short period as leader of the Opposition and now more than 75 years old, St. Laurent's motivation to be involved in politics was gone. He announced his intention to retire from politics. He was succeeded as Liberal Party leader by his former secretary of state for external affairs and representative at the United Nations, Lester B. Pearson, at the party's leadership convention in January 1958.

St. Laurent preferred law over politics. In a 1961 interview with the CBC, he stated, "One can be more outspoken, frank and sincere before the courts than he could be before the public audience in a political campaign." In that same interview, St. Laurent acknowledged that the Pipeline Debate played a major role in his 1957 loss, stating, "Perhaps I didn't say as much as I should have; people do make mistakes you know. I did my best and, as a matter of fact, we had become accustomed to carry on as a board of directors and that displeased a part of the Canadian public." St. Laurent admitted that it took a while to resume his good mood after a sudden electoral loss.

After his political retirement, he returned to practising law and living quietly and privately with his family. During his retirement, he was called into the public spotlight one final time in 1967 to be made a Companion of the Order of Canada, a newly created award.

St. Laurent was appointed a Companion of the Order of Canada on July 6, 1967. His citation reads:

Former Prime Minister of Canada. For his service to his country.

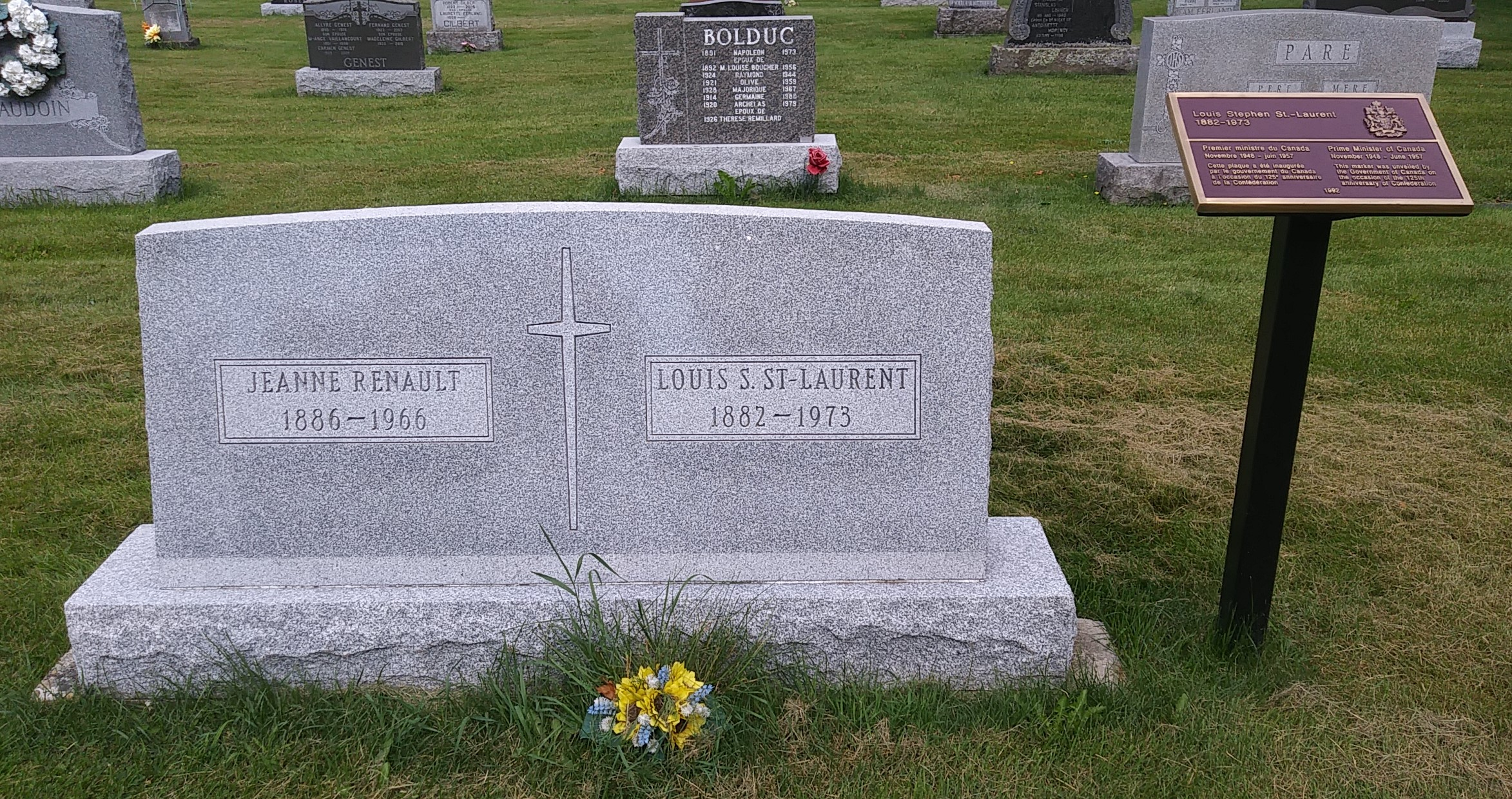
St. Laurent's grave site

Louis Stephen St. Laurent died from heart failure on July 25, 1973, in Quebec City, Quebec, aged 91 and was buried at Saint Thomas d'Aquin Cemetery in his hometown of Compton, Quebec.

== Legacy and memorials ==
St. Laurent presided over the beginning of a new period in Canadian history, post-WW2 Canada. Many have referred to this period as "Canada's Golden Age". St. Laurent's government was modestly progressive, fiscally responsible, and run with business-like efficiency. St. Laurent's former senior servant, Robert Gordon Robertson, wrote, "St Laurent's administrations from 1949 to 1956 probably gave Canada the most consistently good, financially responsible, trouble-free government the country has had in its entire history." One of St. Laurent's cabinet ministers, Jack Pickersgill, noted of him, "St. Laurent had made governing Canada look so easy that the people thought anyone could do it—and thus they elected John Diefenbaker."

Canadian author and professor, Robert Bothwell, wrote, "St. Laurent had many of the best characteristics of a prime minister but few of the best attributes of a politician. In his most productive years in the job, 1948 to 1954, he presided over a cabinet of strong ministers, many of them first-class politicians. His views and theirs generally coincided, though when they did not, it was the prime minister who prevailed. His fundamental commitment was to national unity, which he interpreted broadly in terms of an expansive federal power. At home and abroad he was an activist, which an abundant economy allowed him to be."

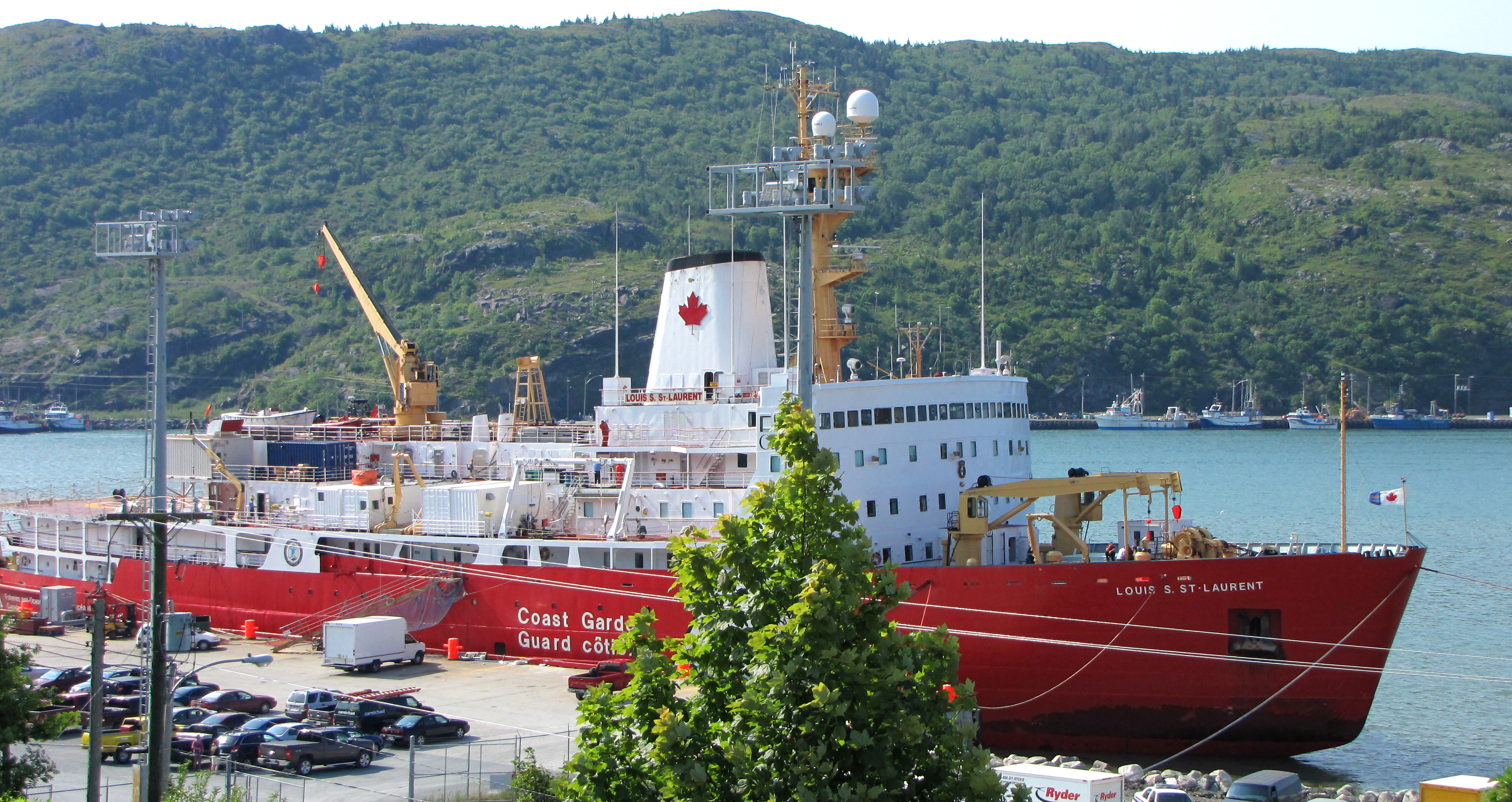
CCGS Louis S. St-Laurent, heavy icebreaker

St. Laurent was ranked #4 on a survey of the first 20 prime ministers (through Jean Chrétien) of Canada done by Canadian historians, and used by J. L. Granatstein and Norman Hillmer in their book Prime Ministers: Ranking Canada's Leaders.

The house and grounds in Compton where St. Laurent was born were designated a National Historic Site of Canada in 1973. St. Laurent's residence at 201 Grande-Allée Est in Quebec City is protected as a Recognized Federal Heritage Building.

CCGS Louis S. St-Laurent, a Canadian Coast Guard Heavy Arctic Icebreaker, is named after him.

Louis St. Laurent School in Edmonton, Alberta. is named in his honour, as well as the Louis St-Laurent high school in East Angus, Quebec.

The riding, Louis-Saint-Laurent, is named in his honour. Created in 2003, it partially consists of St. Laurent's old riding of Quebec East.

== See also ==
- List of prime ministers of Canada

Political offices
Preceded by Joseph E. Michaud (acting)	Minister of Justice; 1941 – 1946	Succeeded by James Ilsley
Preceded by William Lyon Mackenzie King	Secretary of State for External Affairs; 1946 – 1948	Succeeded by Lester B. Pearson
Preceded by James Ilsley	Minister of Justice; 1948	Succeeded by Stuart Sinclair Garson
Preceded by William Lyon Mackenzie King	Prime Minister of Canada; 1948–1957	Succeeded by John Diefenbaker
Preceded by William Lyon Mackenzie King	President of the Privy Council; 1948–1957	Succeeded by Lionel Chevrier
Preceded by John Diefenbaker	Leader of the Opposition; 1957–1958	Succeeded by Lester B. Pearson
Party political offices
Preceded by William Lyon Mackenzie King	Leader of the Liberal Party of Canada; 1948 – 1958	Succeeded by Lester B. Pearson
Parliament of Canada
Preceded by Ernest Lapointe	Member of Parliament for Quebec East; 1942 – 1958	Succeeded by Yvon-Roma Tassé
