= St. Thomas Aquinas Cemetery =

Cemetery in Compton, Estrie Region, Quebec

Coordinates: 45.2395°N 71.8298°W

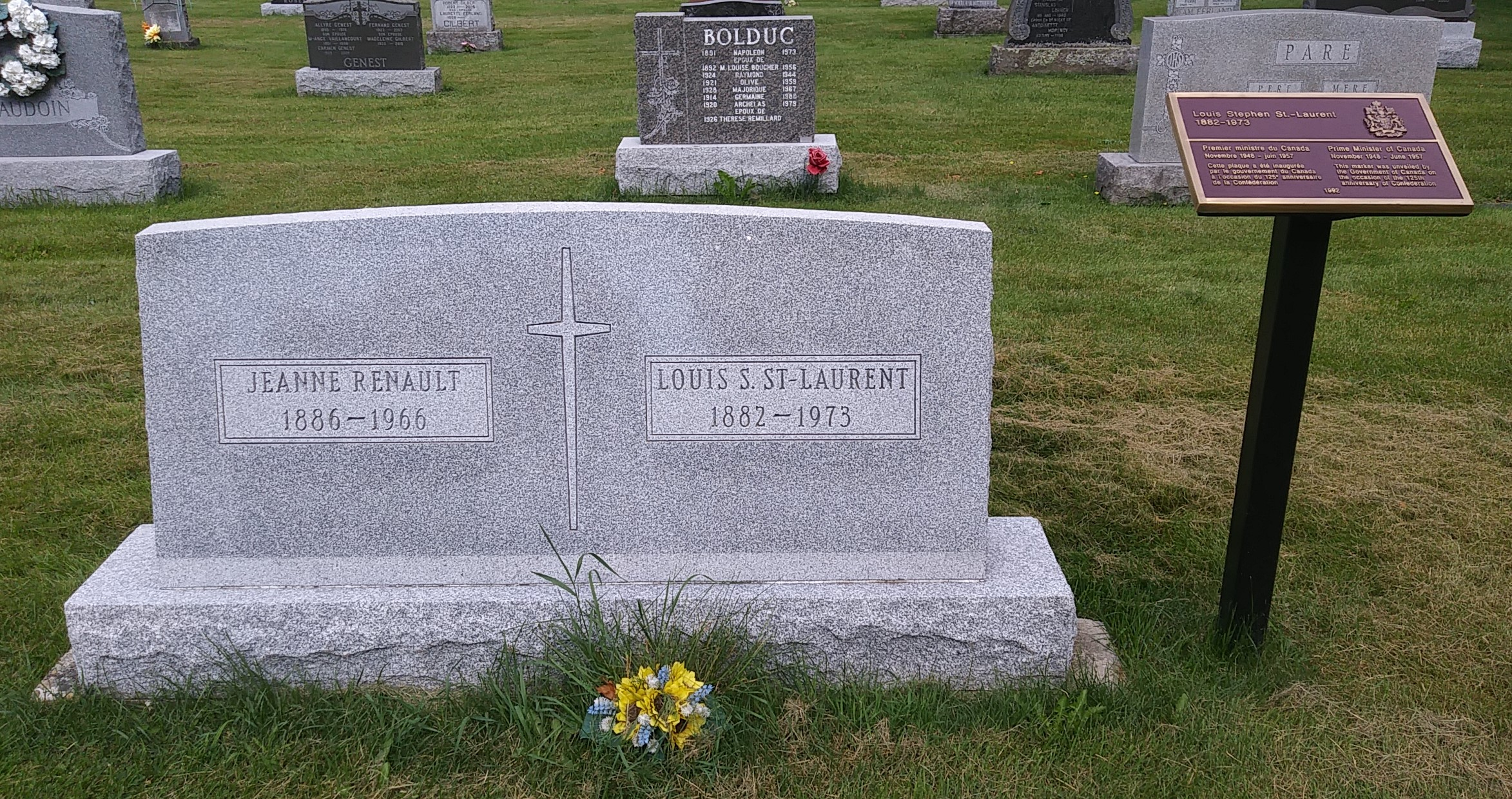
St. Laurent's grave site

St. Thomas Aquinas Cemetery (also known as Cimetière Saint-Thomas-d'Aquinis) is a cemetery located in Compton, Quebec. It is most notable for being the burial place of Canadian prime minister Louis St. Laurent (1882–1973).

Established in the 1850s, the cemetery is the resting place for a few of St. Laurent family, including the prime minister's daughter Madeleine St. Laurent.

== See also ==
- St-Rémi-de-Napierville Cemetery, burial place of Pierre Trudeau in St-Rémi-de-Napierville, Quebec
- Maclaren Cemetery, burial place of Lester Pearson
