= Paul-Étienne Grandbois =

Canadian politician

Paul-Étienne Grandbois (c. 1846 – September 18, 1907) was a physician and political figure in Quebec. He represented Témiscouata in the House of Commons of Canada from 1878 to 1896 as a Conservative member.

He was born in Ste-Philomène, Châteauguay County, Canada East and was educated at the Collège Saint-Sulpice, the Petit Séminaire de St. Therèse de Blainville and the Université Laval. In 1873, he married a Miss Pelletier. He served as government whip from 1885 to 1891. Granbois ran unsuccessfully for reelection to the House of Commons in 1896, 1900 and 1904.
