= Camille-Eugène Pouliot =

Canadian politician

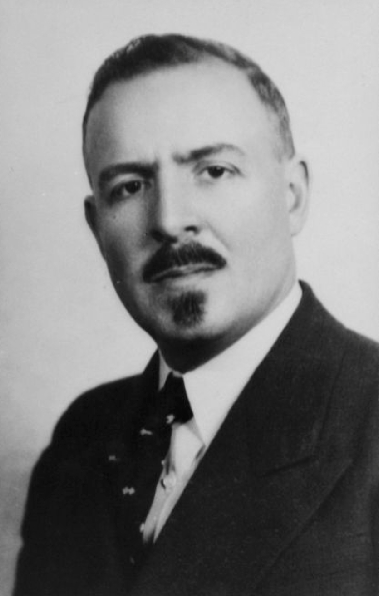

Minister of Hunting and Fishing
- In office 1944–1960
- Preceded by: Valmore Bienvenue
- Succeeded by: Gérard D. Levesque

Member of the Legislative Assembly of Quebec for Gaspé-Sud
- In office 1936–1962
- Preceded by: Alexandre Chouinard
- Succeeded by: Guy Fortier

Personal details
- Born: November 29, 1897 Fraserville (Rivière-du-Loup), Quebec
- Died: April 22, 1967 (aged 69) Sherbrooke, Quebec
- Party: Union Nationale
- Spouse: Anne-Eva McDonald
- Relations: Joseph-Camille Pouliot (father), Jean-François Pouliot (cousin)
- Children: Suzanne, Pierre, Marc, Michel and Marie
- Education: Université de Montréal
- Profession: Physician

Military service
- Allegiance: Canada
- Branch/service: 259th Battalion, Canadian Army
- Years of service: 1917 – 1919
- Rank: Sergeant
- Battles/wars: Siege of Omsk

Camille-Eugène Pouliot M.D. (better known as Camille Pouliot) (November 29, 1897 – April 22, 1967) was a Canadian physician and provincial politician.

Born in Fraserville (Rivière-du-Loup), Quebec, Pouliot was the Minister of Hunting and Fishing from 1944 to 1960 and member of the Legislative Assembly of Quebec for Gaspé-Sud from 1936 to 1962.
