= St-Rémi-de-Napierville Cemetery =

Cemetery in Monteregie Region, Quebec, Canada

Coordinates: 45°15′19″N 73°36′32″W

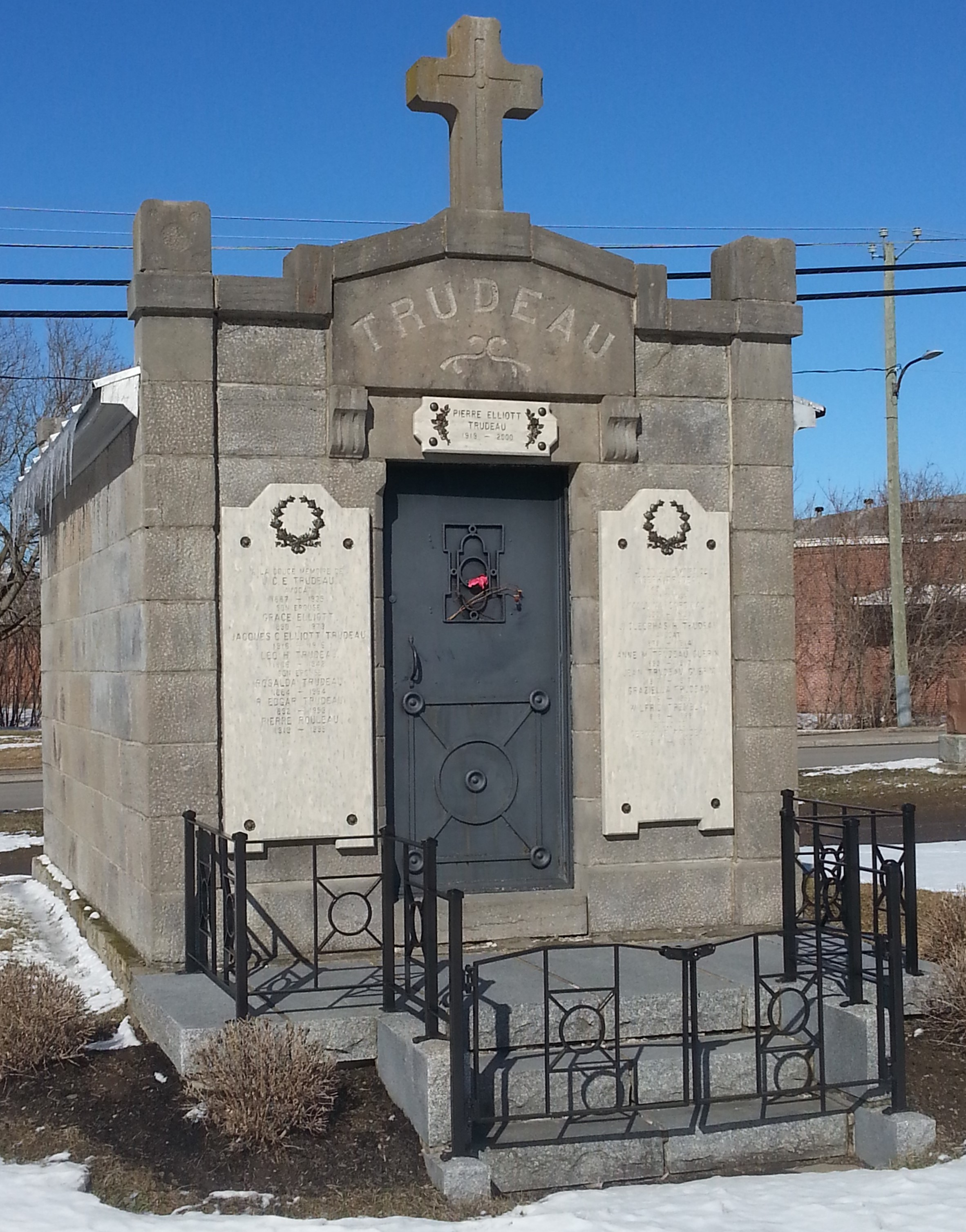
Trudeau family mausoleum

St-Rémi-de-Napierville Cemetery is a small Catholic cemetery in Saint-Rémi, Quebec. It is located at 232 rue Saint-André on the south side of the street, east of rue Saint-Paul.

It is the final resting place of Canada's 15th Prime Minister, Pierre Elliott Trudeau (1919–2000), in the Trudeau family mausoleum that can be seen from rue Saint-André. During the night of April 24–25, 2008, the Trudeau family mausoleum was defaced with "FLQ" and the French word for "traitor" written in spray-paint (see October Crisis).

== See also ==
- St. Thomas Aquinas Cemetery, burial place of Louis St. Laurent in Compton, Quebec
- Maclaren Cemetery, burial place of Lester B. Pearson in Wakefield, Quebec
