= Mila Mulroney =

Wife of the 18th Prime Minister of Canada, Brian Mulroney

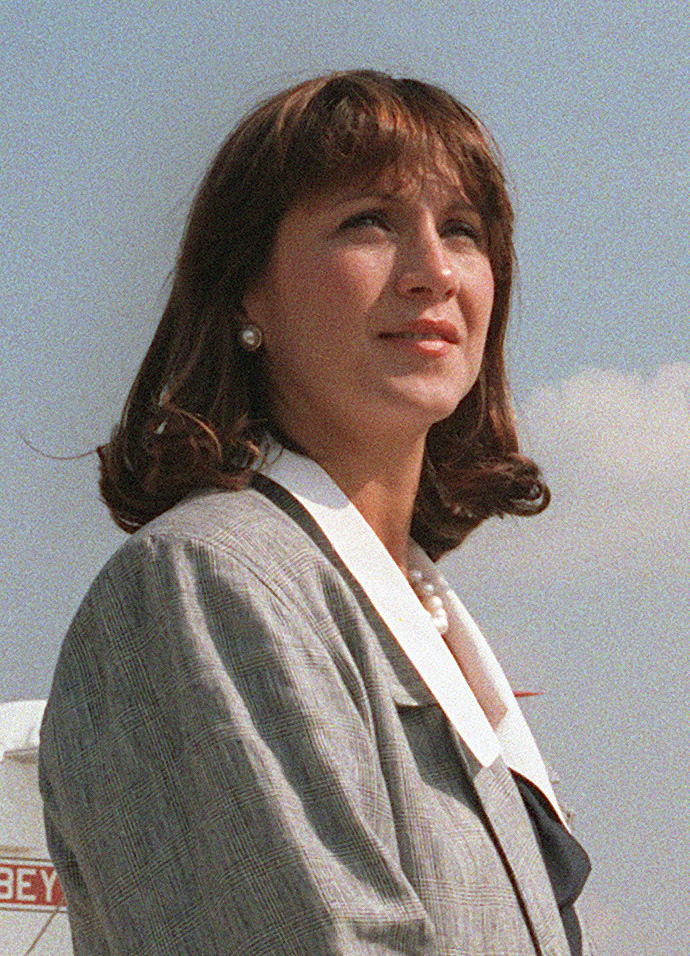
- Mulroney in 1984

Chancellor of St. Francis Xavier University
- Incumbent
- Assumed office December 1, 2024
- President: Andrew Hakin
- Preceded by: John Peacock

Personal details
- Born: Milica Pivnički; July 13, 1953 (age 73) Sarajevo, PR Bosnia-Herzegovina, FPR Yugoslavia
- Spouse: Brian Mulroney (m. 1973; died 2024)
- Children: 4 (including Caroline and Ben)
- Relatives: Jessica Mulroney (daughter-in-law)
- Education: Concordia University

Milica "Mila" Mulroney (née Pivnički; Serbian Cyrillic: Милица "Мила" Пивнички; born July 13, 1953) is the widow of the 18th Prime Minister of Canada, Brian Mulroney. She was notable for taking on a greater role during her husband's tenure than previous spouses of Canadian prime ministers and for her work for children's charities; she was also criticized for her lavish spending habits. She is the chancellor of St. Francis Xavier University in Nova Scotia, where her late husband attended.

== Early life ==
Mulroney was born Milica Pivnički to Serbian Orthodox parents Dimitrije "Mita" and Bogdanka (née Ilić) in Sarajevo, Bosnia and Herzegovina, Yugoslavia. Her first years were spent in the city of Sarajevo where her father practised medicine. In 1956, Pivnički took a research fellowship position at the Royal Victoria Hospital's Allan Memorial Institute of Psychiatry in Montreal. While his pregnant wife Bogdanka waited to join him, she moved with young Milica back to their hometown of Novi Bečej, Serbia. Finally, two years later, in 1958, she and their two children (five-year-old Milica and one-year-old Jovan) emigrated to Canada and joined Dimitrije in Montreal. Mila, the elder child, studied engineering at Concordia University, but did not graduate.

At age 19, she married Brian Mulroney, then a 34-year-old lawyer, on May 26, 1973. Both were involved with the Progressive Conservatives (PC) in Westmount. They have one daughter, Caroline, and three sons, Ben, Mark, and Nicolas. Their youngest child, Nicolas, was born while the family was living in 24 Sussex Drive.

== During Brian Mulroney's tenure ==
Mila was a radical change from the wives of recent prime ministers—the feminist Maureen McTeer and Margaret Trudeau. Being a housewife, she greatly appealed to that demographic, especially in her responses to criticism from prominent feminists (including, in 1987, remarks from Sheila Copps). Many PC campaign buttons featured both Mulroney's face and hers, and Ontario Premier Bill Davis commented to Brian, "Mila will get you more votes for you than you will for yourself."

She assumed a greater role than many Prime Ministers' wives while Mulroney was in office by campaigning for several children's charities. Her role, which some claimed was trying to become a "First Lady", was criticized (especially when she hired a personal office and staff and for her redecoration of the Prime Minister's residence). Her shopping became tabloid fodder, with some in the press dubbing her "Imelda" for her love of shoes (she had over 100 pairs).

== After Brian Mulroney tenure ==
Mila Mulroney is former celebrity patron of the Canadian Cystic Fibrosis Foundation and was a director of Astral. In 2019, she was knighted in Serbia by Ivica Dačić (Knight of the St. Sava Order of Diplomatic Pacifism). She was announced as the next chancellor of St. Francis Xavier University in 2024.

== See also ==
- Spouse of the prime minister of Canada

Honorary titles
Preceded by Geills Turner	Spouse of the Prime Minister of Canada; 1984–1993	Succeeded by Aline Chrétien
