= Maureen McTeer =

Canadian author and lawyer

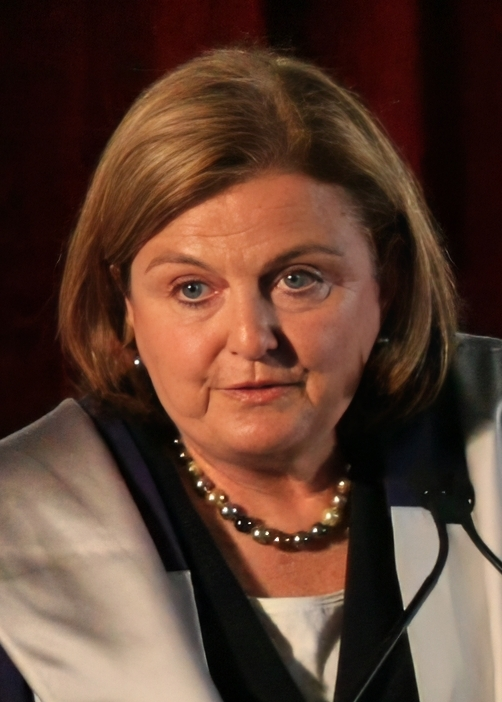
- McTeer in 2010
- Education: University of Ottawa; University of Ottawa Faculty of Law; University of Sheffield
- Occupations: Author, lawyer, professor
- Known for: Spouse of the Prime Minister of Canada
- Spouse: Joe Clark (m. 1973)
- Children: Catherine Clark

Maureen Anne McTeer OC is a Canadian author and lawyer, married to Joe Clark, the 16th Prime Minister of Canada.

== Family and education ==
McTeer was born to John and Bea McTeer. Her father taught her and her older sister, Colleen, to play hockey, resulting in McTeer's childhood dream of playing in the NHL. Her commitment to feminism was born when her father reminded her that girls do not play in the NHL. She switched her focus to her academic and debating talents, which earned her a scholarship to the University of Ottawa. She earned an undergraduate degree in 1973 and a law degree in 1976, both from Ottawa, where she served as features editor of the student newspaper, The Fulcrum, and was a member of the English debate team and the Progressive Conservative Campus Club. McTeer was later awarded an MA in biotechnology, law and ethics from the University of Sheffield, and in 2008 she received an honorary LLD from that institution.

== Wife of the prime minister ==
McTeer worked as a member of Joe Clark's staff before marrying him in 1973. When Clark became leader of the Progressive Conservative Party of Canada in 1976, McTeer became controversial for keeping her own surname and maintaining her own career. At one official luncheon for Queen Elizabeth, the Queen Mother, where McTeer was seated with the guest of honour, the other women at the table teased McTeer by addressing her always as "Mrs. Clark". The Queen Mother, however, did not, and after McTeer escorted the Queen Mother to her car, the latter said "Don't be bothered by criticism," and, left as parting words: "Good Luck … Ms. McTeer." As of 2022, McTeer remains the only wife of a Canadian prime minister not to assume any part of her husband's surname; although both Laureen Teskey Harper and Sophie Grégoire Trudeau had kept their own birth surnames in their earlier years of marriage, but shifted to using their husbands's surnames upon assuming the role of prime minister's spouse, in part because of the controversy McTeer experienced.

== Career ==
McTeer is a lawyer, specializing in health policy. She has also been a professor at various universities. In the 1988 federal election, McTeer ran as a Progressive Conservative candidate in Carleton—Gloucester, hoping to get elected alongside her husband. Despite the party's re-election victory, McTeer was not elected in her riding, coming second to the Liberal candidate, Eugène Bellemare. As of 2023, however, she remains the only spouse of a former Canadian Prime Minister to have run for political office herself.

McTeer was also a professor and taught at the Universities of Dalhousie, Calgary and British Columbia in Canada, and was a visiting scholar at the University of California at Berkeley. McTeer was also a distinguished scholar in residence at American University in the Government department and lectured at George Mason University. McTeer is also the author of three books, In my own Name (2011), her autobiography, Parliament: Canada's democracy and how it works (1995), and Residences: Homes of Canada's leaders (1982). McTeer also wrote articles for various academic journals, many on the ethics of health, including euthanasia. Maureen McTeer promoted Frances Itani's novel Deafening in Canada Reads 2006. She promoted its French-language translation, Une coquille de silence, in Le combat des livres 2006.

== Honours ==
In 1982, McTeer and athlete Abby Hoffman were among the organizers of the Esso Women's Nationals championship tournament for women's ice hockey. One of the tournament's trophies, the Maureen McTeer Trophy, is named for her. She was also awarded the DIVA award for Outstanding Contributions to Women's Health and Well-Being, and the Hungarian President's Cross. She is a specialist in medical law, and for a while was a member of the Royal Commission on Reproductive and Genetic Technologies (1989–1993). She received the Governor General's Award in Commemoration of the Persons Case in 2008. McTeer was also awarded an Honorary Doctorate of Laws from Carleton University in Ottawa in 2010 and an Honorary Doctorate of Civil Law from Acadia University in 2017.

In 2025, she was made an Officer of the Order of Canada.

== Personal life ==
McTeer and her husband have one daughter, Catherine Clark.

== Bibliography ==
- Residences: Homes of Canada's Leaders (1982)
- Tangled Womb: The Politics of Human Reproduction (1992)
- Parliament (1995) – translated into French as Le petit guide du système parlementaire canadien
- Tough Choices: Living and Dying in the 21st Century (1999) – translated into French as Vivre et mourir au 21e siècle: choix et enjeux
- In My Own Name: A Memoir (2003)
- Fertility: 40 Years of Change (2022)

== Electoral record ==
Riding of Carleton—Gloucester

1988 Canadian federal election
Party	Candidate	Votes	%
Liberal	Eugène Bellemare	30,925	48.12
Progressive Conservative	Maureen McTeer	23,964	37.29
New Democratic	Robert Cottingham	6,217	9.67
Christian Heritage	Terese Ferri	2,728	4.24
Rhinoceros	Peter Francis Godfather Quinlan	435	0.68

== See also ==
- Spouse of the prime minister of Canada
