= First Lady of Canada =

- For spouses of the Canadian monarch, see List of Canadian monarchs#Consorts
- For spouses of the governor general of Canada, see Viceregal consort of Canada
- For spouses of the Canadian prime minister, see Spouse of the prime minister of Canada
