= Diana Fox Carney =

British economist and author

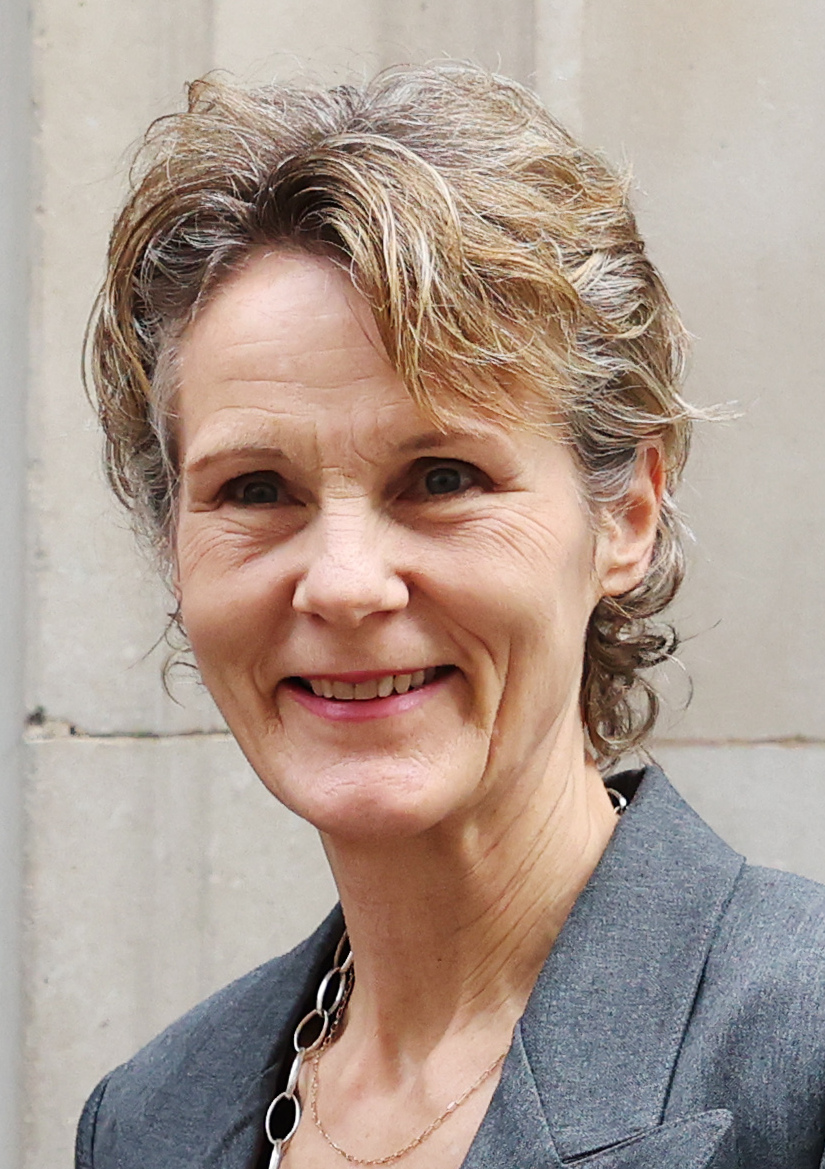
- Carney in 2026

Canadian Ocean Envoy
- Incumbent
- Assumed office September 16, 2026
- Preceded by: Office established

Personal details
- Born: Diana Fox; 1965 (age 60–61) United Kingdom
- Spouse: Mark Carney (m. 1994)
- Children: 4
- Education: University of Oxford; University of Pennsylvania (MA)
- Known for: Spouse of the prime minister of Canada

Diana Fox Carney (née Fox; born 1965) is a British-Canadian economist and climate policy expert who is the spouse of Mark Carney, the 24th prime minister of Canada since 2025.

Specializing in developing nations, she is active in various environmental and social justice causes. She has published research and has collaborated with multiple international think tanks. She has been described as a "widely respected expert on global climate and energy policy", serving as a board member for numerous not-for-profit organisations.

== Early life and education ==
Diana Fox Carney is the daughter of Christopher Fox and Jennifer Atkinson who managed an estate when she was born. She spent her earliest years at Quarwood House, a Gothic mansion near Stow-on-the-Wold, that was later purchased by John Entwistle of The Who. The family then purchased a lucrative pig farm, while Diana and her sister attended Oxford High School for Girls. She then attended Marlborough College in Wiltshire. Her sister Tania would go on to marry Robin Cayzer, 3rd Baron Rotherwick.

Fox Carney has a degree in Philosophy, Politics and Economics, a master's degree in agricultural economics from the University of Oxford, and an MA in international relations from the University of Pennsylvania. In the 1990s, she was one of the stronger skaters on the women's team of the Oxford University Ice Hockey Club, where she met her future husband Mark Carney, who played goaltender for the men's team.

== Career ==
External videos
- " Diana Fox Carney interview" (2013) – Global News via YouTube (7:18 min)

Fox Carney has held senior roles at think tanks in Canada and the UK, focused primarily on energy and climate. She has worked as an agricultural researcher in Africa, for the charity IPPR, and served as the executive director of Pi Capital in the UK. Fox Carney has served on the boards of Save the Children, Friends of the Royal Academy, Ashden, ClientEarth, the Shell Foundation, and BeyondNetZero.

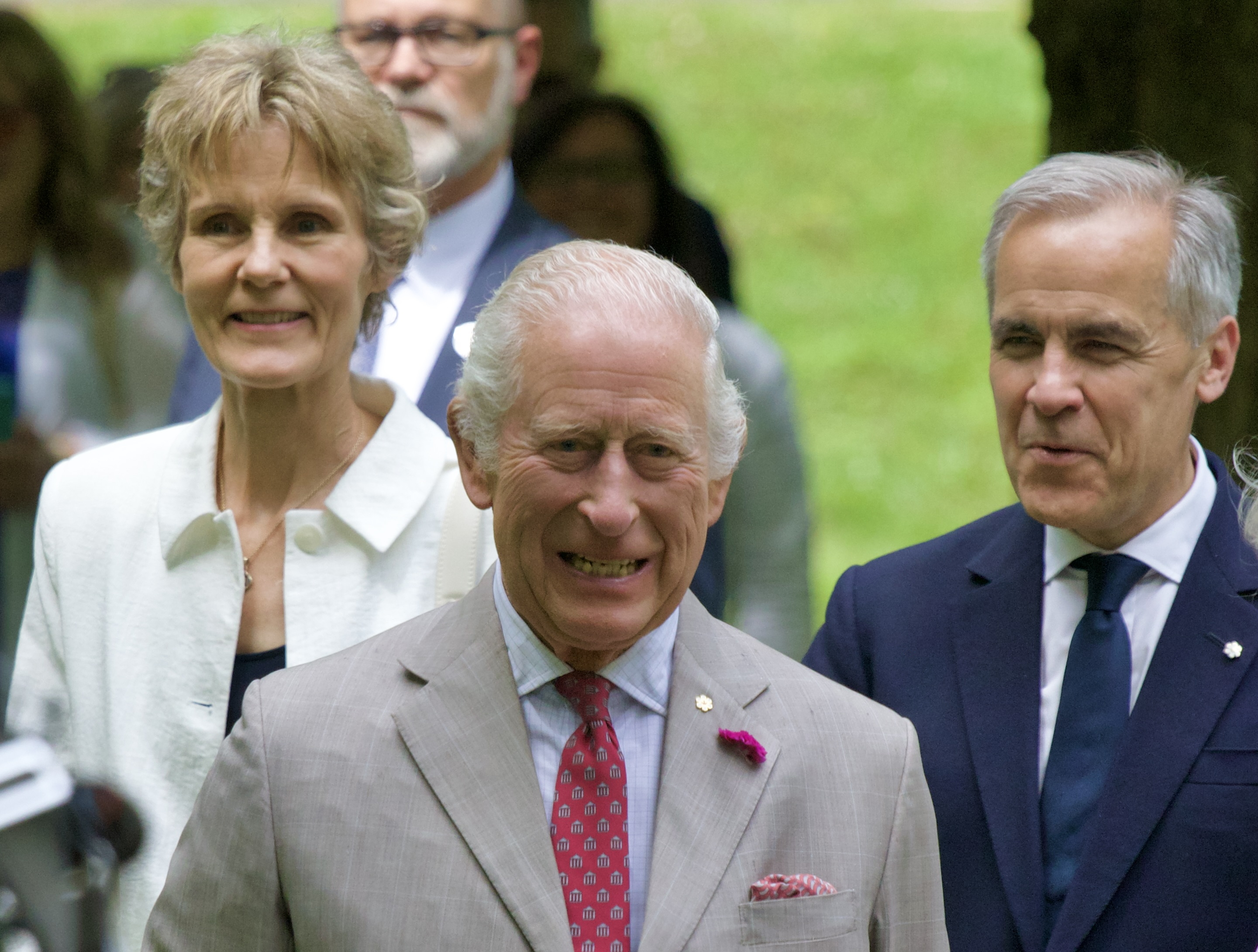
Diana and Mark Carney hosting King Charles at Rideau Hall

In 2013, Fox Carney spoke to a Canadian Parliament’s finance committee about the increasing gap between the rich and poor globally, noting that two-thirds of people were living in countries where the gap had grown over the previous decade.

In April 2013, while vice president of research at the Canada 2020 think tank, she contributed a paper to one of its conferences supporting carbon pricing dialogue. Later that month, she made an appearance on CBC News Network's Power & Politics to discuss the issue, and addressed stories in the British media by stressing that she was her own person with her own ideals separate from her husband. After leaving Canada 2020, she became the London-based Institute for Public Policy Research's director of strategy and engagement, a position she left by 2025.

Fox Carney has been a senior advisor alongside Gerald Butts at Eurasia Group since May 2021. In October 2021, Fox Carney was appointed as a strategic adviser by Willis Towers Watson in its award-winning Climate Resilience Hub.

In September 2026, federal fisheries minister Joanne Thompson appointed her as Canada's first ocean envoy ahead of the 12th Our Ocean Conference, which will be held in Halifax, Nova Scotia. Fox Carney will also chair the event; the position is unpaid.

== Personal life ==
External videos
- " Bank governor Carney's wife defends 'separate opinions'" (2013) – CBC (13:03 min)

Carney met her husband, Mark Carney, playing hockey while studying at the University of Oxford. The couple married in 1994, while Mark was finishing his doctoral thesis. They have four children and lived in Toronto before moving to the Rockcliffe Park neighbourhood of Ottawa and then moving to London in 2013. One of their daughters, Cleo Carney, introduced her father at the Liberal Party leadership convention in 2025. They moved back to Ottawa when Carney left his role at the Bank of England in 2020.

In 2012, Fox Carney caught the attention of the British press with The Daily Telegraph labelling her as an "eco-warrior" for expressing sympathy with the anti-banking occupy movement, stating "global financial institutions are rotten or inadequate".

== Published works ==
- Carney, Diana (1995). Changing Public and Private Roles in Agricultural Service Provision: A Literature Survey. ODI working paper: Overseas Development Institute. Overseas Development Institute. ISBN 978-0-85003-222-2.
- Carney, Diana (1998). Changing Public and Private Roles in Agricultural Service Provision. London: Overseas Development Institute (ODI). ISBN 0-85003-357-8.
- Ashley, Caroline; Carney, Diana (1999). Sustainable livelihoods: lessons from early experience. London: Department for International Development. ISBN 0-85003-419-1.
- Carney, Diana (1 January 2003). "Sustainable Livelihoods Approaches: Progress and Possibilities for Change". ResearchGate.
- Carney, Diana; Farrington, John (2005). Natural Resource Management and Institutional Change. Routledge Research/ODI Development Policy Studies. Taylor & Francis. ISBN 978-1-134-66489-4.

Unofficial roles
Preceded by Sophie Grégoire Trudeau	Spouse of the prime minister of Canada; 2025–present	Incumbent
