= Attempted assassination of Jean Chrétien =

1995 attempted political murder in Canada

On November 5, 1995, André Dallaire (born 1961) attempted to assassinate Canadian prime minister Jean Chrétien. Dallaire, a Canadian from Quebec, claimed that he heard voices that led him to break into the 24 Sussex Drive residence. At trial, Justice Paul Bélanger agreed with Dallaire's earlier diagnosis of paranoid schizophrenia and found Dallaire guilty of attempted murder, but not criminally responsible.

== Biography ==
Born in Longueuil, Quebec, Dallaire was diagnosed as having paranoid schizophrenia at sixteen years of age. He had quit his job at a Montreal convenience store on October 25, 1995, removing all the money out of the cash register and walking off mid-shift. On October 30, his sister reported receiving a letter from him that had been postmarked in Ottawa.

== Break-in ==
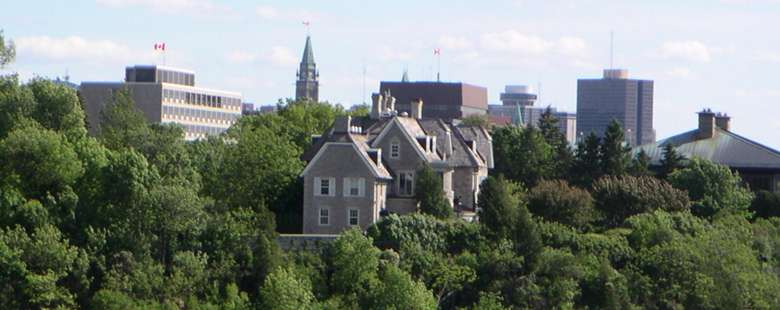
View of 24 Sussex Drive from Rockliffe Park lookout, 2004

At 02:10 UTC−5 on November 5, 1995, Dallaire arrived outside 24 Sussex Drive and spent the next 20 minutes throwing stones onto the grounds and waving at security cameras while carrying a pocket knife alternatively described as three or five inches in length (7.5 or 12.5 cm).

He then climbed the fence and strode over to the house, where he smashed a glass door and entered, wandering around the basement and ground floor for 30 minutes before heading to the Chrétiens' bedroom, where he was confronted by Chrétien's wife, Aline, as he was pulling on his gloves. Aline hurried back into the bedroom and locked the door, rousing her husband, who initially dismissed her story as "just a dream", while she dialled the RCMP officers stationed outside the house. It was reported that either Aline or Jean brandished an Inuit stone sculpture of a loon in case Dallaire broke through the door.

Dallaire did not attempt to break down the door, and waited for the police to arrive. Controversially, it took roughly seven minutes for the police to respond to Aline's desperate call about an intruder trying to kill the prime minister, in part because the first officer to respond had forgotten his key to the residence.

== Legal events ==
Dallaire was kept in a group home for the duration of the trial. Expert witness Dominique Bourget, a psychiatrist with the Royal Ottawa Hospital, testified that Dallaire viewed himself as a "secret agent" avenging the loss of sovereigntist forces in the 1995 Quebec referendum, and that he believed killing the prime minister would cause him to "become a hero for the nation".

His travel during the trial was not restricted, so long as he was accompanied at all times by a worker from the group home. He was formally charged with attempted murder, breaking and entering, possession of a weapon and being unlawfully in a dwelling. His defence counsel was John Hale.

The trial also brought to light the security camera footage of Dallaire freely roaming the property, while RCMP officers should have been monitoring the cameras. Ultimately, four officers were suspended for several months, while three supervisors were reassigned. Reform Party MP and former RCMP constable Jack Ramsay remarked "it's known among RCMP officers that the 24 Sussex job is one of the most boring—and until last fall the force did not dispatch its best people to carry out the job."

Dallaire was found guilty, but deemed not responsible because of mental incompetence.

== Aftermath ==
In 1998, Dallaire spoke to the media, apologizing for his behaviour, and reassuring the Canadian public that he was now on medication that controlled his actions, and that he hoped the Chrétiens could forgive his actions.

After about a year, Dallaire was given a conditional discharge and sent to live in an Ottawa group home.

In 1998, an intoxicated man was found on the grounds of the prime minister's residence, raising questions about the security upgrade undertaken since Dallaire's intrusion.

Reporters revisited the 1995 Dallaire breach after two political attacks in 2014: an August break-in at the home of Liberal Party leader Justin Trudeau, and the gun attack at Parliament Hill in October. It was discussed again in October 2015, after the federal election that made Trudeau prime minister. When Trudeau did not move into 24 Sussex, the prime minister's official residence, the main reasons cited were the fact of the aging residence needing at least ten million dollars in repairs to make it habitable and its lack of security.
