= Sheila Martin =

Canadian politician

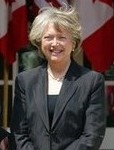
- Born: Sheila Ann Cowan; July 31, 1943 (age 83); Port Arthur, Ontario, Canada
- Education: University of Toronto
- Known for: Spouse of the Prime Minister of Canada
- Spouse: Paul Martin (m. 1965)
- Children: 3

Sheila Ann Martin (née Cowan; born July 31, 1943) is the wife of Paul Martin, who served as the 21st Prime Minister of Canada from December 12, 2003, to February 6, 2006. Her father was William "Bill" Cowan, a lawyer and philanthropist from Windsor, Ontario. She was named after her mother. Sheila was raised Protestant, and graduated from the University of Toronto in 1964.

She and Paul were neighbours and her father was law partner with Paul Martin Sr in Windsor, Ontario. They were engaged over Christmas in 1964 and married on September 11, 1965. They have three sons: Paul William Martin III (born September 11, 1966), Jamie Robert Martin (born June 21, 1969), and David Patrick Martin (born September 13, 1974).

A Canada Steamship Lines ship, Sheila Ann, is named in her honour.

Before her husband became the Prime Minister of Canada, Sheila Martin's work in Ottawa included serving on a committee called Politics and the Pen, and on this committee she helped give prizes and money to Canadian writers. The job was said to fit with her "own literary tastes." In 2002, when Paul Martin left the cabinet, he credited her as a support to him and as an advisor:

Third, I want to thank the many friends who called or sent messages in recent days. I'm enriched by their friendship and their support. In that respect, I want to thank above all others Sheila and my family for their patience and their advice.

Throughout these years, Sheila Martin apparently had little aspirations in regards to her husband's office. Her husband's biographer John Gray quoted her as saying, "Oh, God, I don't want to do this at all, so I just don't think about it."

== See also ==
- Spouse of the prime minister of Canada
