= Catherine Clark (broadcaster) =

Canadian television broadcaster

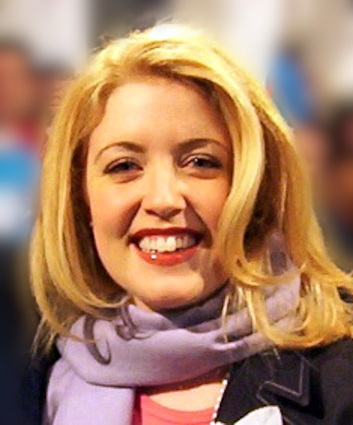
- Catherine Clark in 2003
- Born: Catherine Jane Clark; Ottawa, Ontario, Canada
- Citizenship: Canadian
- Occupations: Television broadcaster, Entrepreneur
- Spouse: Chad Schella (m. 2002)
- Children: Alexandra Schella, Charles Schella
- Parent(s): Joe Clark; Maureen McTeer

Catherine Jane Clark is a Canadian television broadcaster, and the daughter of former Canadian Prime Minister Joe Clark and Maureen McTeer.

== Life and career ==
Clark was born in Ottawa, Ontario. When she was 18, she moved alone to Paris to attend the American University for five months, and lived in a tiny one-bedroom flat. She graduated from the University of Toronto with a degree in art history. After graduating, she worked at the publicity firm Hill & Knowlton.

She played a prominent role in the Joe Clark campaign during the federal election of 2000.

In 2001, she began a career in broadcasting, hosting a television news magazine, Unzipped, for the new Canadian digital cable network ichannel. The show was cancelled the following year due to financial constraints and questionable content at the network, but Clark continued to work for the network in other capacities. In 2004, she joined Rogers Television as host of a daily talk show in Ottawa.

On June 8, 2002, Clark married Chad Schella, formerly the director of player services for the NHL Ottawa Senators and now general manager of government affairs at Canada Post. They have a daughter, Alexandra Charmaine Maureen Schella, born on May 26, 2006, and a son, Charles Roger Dennis Schella, born April 1, 2009. Clark took some time off from television after her daughter's birth, and subsequently joined CPAC, the Canadian parliamentary broadcaster. With CPAC, she hosted Sunday Sound Off, a political debate and panel discussion show, and Beyond Politics, a talk show where she interviews Canadian politicians in depth about their lives outside politics.

As of December 2017, she has her own marketing and public relations firm, Catherine Clark Communications.
