= Deafening (novel) =

2003 novel by Frances Itani

- First edition
- Author: Frances Itani
- Language: English
- Genre: Novel
- Publisher: HarperCollins Canada & Kaiser (USA)
- Publication date: 1 August 2003
- Publication place: Canada
- Media type: Print (hardback & paperback) also Audio Book
- Pages: 378
- ISBN: 0-00-200539-5
- OCLC: 52375316

Deafening is a 2003 novel written by Frances Itani.

The novel is set prior to World War I in the small Ontario town of Deseronto, where the O'Neil family owns a hotel. The book follows the story of Grania O'Neil, a girl who lost her hearing when she was five years old as a result of contracting scarlet fever. The novel follows Grania and her family as they learn to accept and adapt to her as a non-hearing person. The first part of the novel establishes the central role Grania's grandmother, known as "Mamo," plays in helping Grania acquire and understand the language of the hearing world, and in convincing Grania's parent to send her to the School for the Deaf in a nearby city. Though the separation from her family is initially traumatic for Grania, the School for the Deaf opens a world of friendship, opportunity and love for Grania.

The second half of the novel alternates between Grania's narrative and that of her young husband, Jim, who becomes a stretcher bearer in the First World War. The novel parallels her struggle with the hearing world with Jim's struggle to survive, in mind and body, the staggering, soul-killing horror of war.

== Awards and recognition ==
- 2004 Commonwealth Writers' Prize for Best Book (Caribbean & Canada region).
- Shortlisted for the William Saroyan International Literary Prize, 2005.
- Shortlisted for International Dublin Literary Award.
- Deafening was chosen for inclusion in Canada Reads 2006, where it was championed by lawyer and author Maureen McTeer. Une coquille de silence, the French-language translation of Deafening, was chosen for inclusion in Le combat des livres 2006, where it was also championed by McTeer.
