= Spouse of the prime minister of Canada =

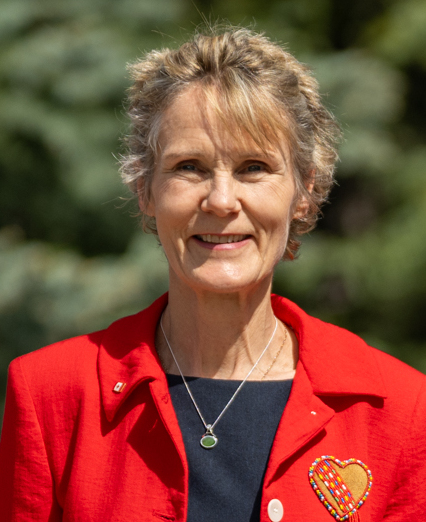
- Current; Diana Fox Carney since March 14, 2025

The spouse of the prime minister of Canada (French: époux du premier ministre du Canada) is the wife or husband of the prime minister of Canada. Diana Fox Carney is married to the current prime minister, Mark Carney.

Twenty women have been wives of prime ministers of Canada; Kim Campbell, the only female prime minister, was unmarried during her time in office. As semi-public figures, spouses are often present at various ceremonial, diplomatic, or partisan activities alongside the prime minister. Spouses often pursue philanthropic or charitable endeavours on their own, although the spouses have varied in how actively they sought or accepted the public spotlight.

Some media outlets have styled prime ministers' wives as the "first lady of Canada", similar to the style of first lady used in the neighbouring United States and other republics. This is not a recognized nor accurately applicable title, as the spouses both of Canada's monarch and of the governor general take precedence over the spouse of the prime minister. Rather, use of first lady is based on the influence of American media and a general misunderstanding of Canadian civics.

== Public role ==
The prime minister is not the head of state; thus, their spouse does not officially play as active a role in Canadian affairs as do the royal and viceregal consorts. The prime minister's spouse, however, is still generally regarded as a public or semi-public figure, frequently accompanying the prime minister on campaign and other public appearances, and often hosting dignitaries at the prime minister's residence.

At times, prime ministers' spouses have used their public status to promote charitable causes: Mila Mulroney was a spokesperson for the Canadian Cystic Fibrosis Foundation and other children's charities, Aline Chrétien was an active campaigner for literacy programs, and Laureen Harper was known for her support of animal welfare organizations such as the Ottawa Humane Society.

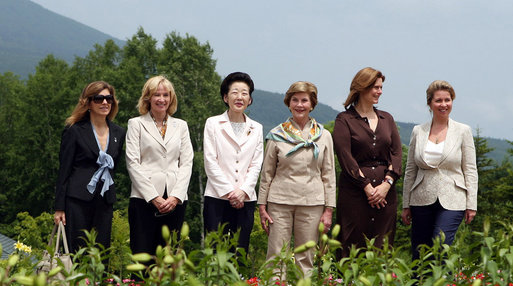
Spouse of the prime minister of Canada Laureen Harper (second from left) at 2008 G8 Summit in Hokkaidō, Japan

Many have also held an unofficial but influential role as a political or campaign advisor to their husbands: Laureen Harper was considered her husband's "secret weapon", whose instinctive sense of campaign optics proved invaluable to her husband's career; Harper, for example, was credited as the brains behind a public appearance in which her husband, Prime Minister Stephen Harper, appeared on stage at Ottawa's National Arts Centre to sing the Beatles' "With a Little Help from My Friends", which was widely perceived as softening the prime minister's somewhat stiff and bureaucratic public image. Despite her relatively low public profile, Aline Chrétien was also recognized as a powerful advisor to her husband; Maclean's magazine once wrote, "Never mind calling her the power behind the throne—she shares the seat of power", and columnist Allan Fotheringham later called her the second most powerful political figure in Canada, behind her husband but ahead of any elected member of Parliament or any staffer in the Prime Minister's Office.

Some prime ministers' spouses have also attracted attention for other reasons: Maryon Pearson was noted for her prickly wit, having made a number of famous quips which are still regularly featured in anthologies of famous quotations. Margaret Trudeau, whom Pierre Trudeau married while in office, became a notable celebrity in her own right, most famously when she was featured on the covers of international tabloids after being seen partying at Studio 54. Maureen McTeer, spouse of Joe Clark, attracted controversy when she became the first spouse of a prime minister to retain her own surname after marriage. Mila Mulroney also rose to some notoriety due to her spending habits, and was satirized in Frank as Imelda because of her purportedly large collection of shoes.

Because the role of a prime minister's spouse is not formally defined, however, a spouse may face criticism over her public visibility itself. In 2016, Sophie Grégoire Trudeau faced some controversy when she stated in an interview that she needed a staff assistant to keep on top of all the requests she received for public and charitable appearances, which some critics described as coming from a sense of personal entitlement or an attempt to turn herself into a First Lady.

== Other notes ==
Canada has had two prime ministers who were bachelors, William Lyon Mackenzie King and R.B. Bennett. Mackenzie Bowell, a widower whose wife, Harriet, died in 1884, was also not married during his term in office. Pierre Trudeau began his term as a bachelor, became the first Canadian prime minister to get married while in office and ended it as Canada's first divorced prime minister.

Three other Canadian prime ministers–Alexander Mackenzie, John Diefenbaker, and John A. Macdonald—were widowers who remarried before becoming prime minister. Macdonald, Canada's first prime minister, had been a widower for ten years while in office in the former Province of Canada. His first wife was Isabella Clark, who died in 1857. Macdonald married his second wife, Agnes Bernard, while in London in 1867, during the final negotiations leading up to Confederation. Mackenzie's first wife was Helen Neil, and Diefenbaker's was Edna Brower.

Canada has also had one female prime minister, Kim Campbell. As she had finalized her divorce from her second husband, Howard Eddy, in early 1993, there has never been a male spouse of the prime minister (although Campbell's first husband, Nathan Divinsky, did try to attract media attention in 1993 by billing himself as the ex-husband of the prime minister). She briefly dated Gregory Lekhtman, the inventor of Exerlopers, during her term as prime minister, but kept the relationship private and did not involve him in the 1993 election campaign. In 1997, after her prime ministership, she entered into a common-law marriage with Hershey Felder.

Maureen McTeer maintained a career during her life at 24 Sussex; although several others have had independent careers prior to their spouse's term as prime minister, all others have put their own careers on hold to concentrate on the public and ceremonial and philanthropic aspects of their role as a leader's spouse. McTeer was also the only spouse of a prime minister to use her birth surname, rather than her husband's surname, in her public life; although Laureen (Teskey) Harper and Sophie Grégoire Trudeau both used their birth surnames prior to their husbands becoming prime ministers, both opted to minimize any controversy by using their husband's surname once they were elevated to the public role of a prime minister's spouse. Grégoire Trudeau did, however, become the first spouse of a prime minister to use her husband's surname with her own. Diana Fox Carney followed by also using both surnames.

== Spouses of the prime ministers ==
No.	Image	Name	Date of birth	Date of marriage	Prime Minister (Spouse)	Date tenure began	Age at tenure start	Date tenure ended	Date of death
1	Portrait of Agnes Macdonald	Agnes Macdonald (née Bernard)	August 24, 1836	February 16, 1867	Sir John A. Macdonald	July 1, 1867	30 years, 176 days	November 5, 1873	September 5, 1920
2	Portrait of Jane Mackenzie	Jane Mackenzie (née Sym)	March 22, 1825	June 17, 1853	Alexander Mackenzie	November 7, 1873	48 years, 230 days	October 8, 1878	March 30, 1893
(1)	Portrait of Agnes Macdonald	Agnes Macdonald (née Bernard)	August 24, 1836	February 16, 1867	Sir John A. Macdonald	October 17, 1878	42 years, 54 days	June 6, 1891	September 5, 1920
3		Mary Abbott (née Bethune)	October 17, 1823	July 26, 1849	Sir John Joseph Caldwell Abbott	June 16, 1891	67 years, 242 days	November 24, 1892	February 25, 1898
4	Portrait of Annie Thompson	Annie Thompson (née Affleck)	June 26, 1845	July 5, 1870	Sir John Sparrow David Thompson	December 5, 1892	47 years, 162 days	December 12, 1894	April 10, 1913
		None (widower)			Sir Mackenzie Bowell	December 21, 1894	66 years, 224 days	April 27, 1896	
5	Portrait of Frances Tupper	Frances Tupper (née Morse)	March 14, 1826	October 6, 1846	Sir Charles Tupper	May 1, 1896	70 years, 48 days	July 8, 1896	May 11, 1912
6	Portrait of Zoé Laurier	Zoé Laurier (née Lafontaine)	June 26, 1841	August 13, 1868	Sir Wilfrid Laurier	July 11, 1896	55 years, 15 days	October 7, 1911	November 1, 1921
7	Photo of Sir Robert and Lady Borden	Laura Borden (née Bond)	November 26, 1861	September 25, 1889	Sir Robert Laird Borden	October 10, 1911	49 years, 318 days	July 10, 1920	September 7, 1940
8	Photo of Isabel Meighen	Isabel Meighen (née Cox)	April 18, 1882	June 1, 1904	Arthur Meighen	July 10, 1920	38 years, 83 days	December 29, 1921	September 6, 1985
		None (never married)			William Lyon Mackenzie King	December 29, 1921		June 29, 1926	
(8)	Photo of Isabel Meighen	Isabel Meighen (née Cox)	April 18, 1882	June 1, 1904	Arthur Meighen	June 29, 1926	44 years, 72 days	November 25, 1926	September 6, 1985
		None (never married)			William Lyon Mackenzie King	November 25, 1926		August 7, 1930	
		None (never married)			R.B. Bennett	August 7, 1930		October 23, 1935	
		None (never married)			William Lyon Mackenzie King	October 23, 1935		November 15, 1948	
9	Photo of Louis and Jeanne St. Laurent	Jeanne St. Laurent (née Renault)	October 22, 1886	May 19, 1908	Louis Stephen St. Laurent	November 15, 1948	62 years, 24 days	June 21, 1957	November 14, 1966
10	Photo of Olive Diefenbaker	Olive Diefenbaker (née Freeman)	April 14, 1902	December 8, 1953	John Diefenbaker	June 21, 1957	55 years, 68 days	April 22, 1963	December 22, 1976
11		Maryon Pearson (née Moody)	December 13, 1901	August 22, 1925	Lester B. Pearson	April 22, 1963	61 years, 130 days	April 20, 1968	December 26, 1989
		None (unmarried as of 1968; married in office)			Pierre Trudeau	April 20, 1968		March 4, 1971	
12	Photo of Margaret Trudeau	Margaret Trudeau (née Sinclair)	September 10, 1948	March 4, 1971	Pierre Trudeau	March 4, 1971	22 years, 175 days	June 4, 1979 (Note: Pierre and Margaret Trudeau separated on May 27, 1977, but, did not obtain a divorce until April 2, 1984. Thus, they were married when Pierre first left the prime ministerial office, on June 4, 1979, and when he was reappointed as prime minister on March 3, 1980.)	Living
13		Maureen McTeer	September 27, 1952	June 30, 1973	Joe Clark	June 4, 1979	26 years, 250 days	March 3, 1980	Living
(12)	Photo of Margaret Trudeau	Margaret Trudeau (née Sinclair)	September 10, 1948	March 4, 1971	Pierre Trudeau	March 3, 1980	31 years, 175 days	April 2, 1984	Living
		None (divorced)			Pierre Trudeau	April 2, 1984		June 30, 1984	
14		Geills Turner (née Kilgour)	December 23, 1937	May 11, 1963	John Turner	June 30, 1984	46 years, 190 days	September 17, 1984	Living
15	Photo of Mila Mulroney	Mila Mulroney (née Pivnički)	July 13, 1953	May 26, 1973	Brian Mulroney	September 17, 1984	31 years, 66 days	June 25, 1993	Living
		None (divorced)			Kim Campbell	June 25, 1993		November 4, 1993	
16	Photo of Aline Chrétien	Aline Chrétien (née Chaîné)	May 14, 1936	September 10, 1957	Jean Chrétien	November 4, 1993	57 years, 174 days	December 12, 2003	September 12, 2020
17		Sheila Martin (née Cowan)	July 31, 1943	September 11, 1965	Paul Martin	December 12, 2003	60 years, 134 days	February 6, 2006	Living
18	Photo of Laureen Harper	Laureen Harper (née Teskey)	June 23, 1963	December 11, 1993	Stephen Harper	February 6, 2006	42 years, 228 days	November 4, 2015	Living
19	Photo of Sophie Grégoire Trudeau	Sophie Grégoire Trudeau (née Grégoire)	April 24, 1975	May 28, 2005	Justin Trudeau	November 4, 2015	40 years, 194 days	March 14, 2025 (Note: Justin and Sophie Trudeau separated on August 2, 2023.)	Living
20	Photo of Diana Fox Carney	Diana Fox Carney (née Fox)	September, 1965	July, 1994	Mark Carney	March 14, 2025	59 years, ~165–194 days	Present	Living

== See also ==
- List of royal consorts of Canada
- Viceregal consort of Canada
