= Ted Itani =

Canadian military officer and humanitarian (1939–2021)

Tetsuo "Ted" Itani, CM (June 23, 1939 – March 22, 2021) was a Canadian military officer and humanitarian, who was inducted as a Member of the Order of Canada in 2016.

== Biography ==
Born on Vancouver Island to immigrant parents from Japan, his family was forcibly relocated as part of the Japanese internment in Canada during World War II. After their release from the internment camp, the family settled in Kelowna, British Columbia, where he joined the Royal Canadian Army Cadets. He served in the Canadian military for over three decades, reaching the rank of major by the time of his retirement in the early 1990s.

While in the military, he married writer Frances (Hill) Itani in 1967. They resided in Ottawa, Ontario.

Following his retirement, he undertook humanitarian work with the International Red Cross, and worked as a peacekeeping educator for the Pearson Peacekeeping Centre.

In early January 2021, he was hospitalized with serious brain and lung injuries after being struck by the mirror of an OC Transpo bus while out for a run. He died in hospital on March 22, 2021, at the age of 81.
