= John Wentworth Russell =

Canadian artist (1879–1959)

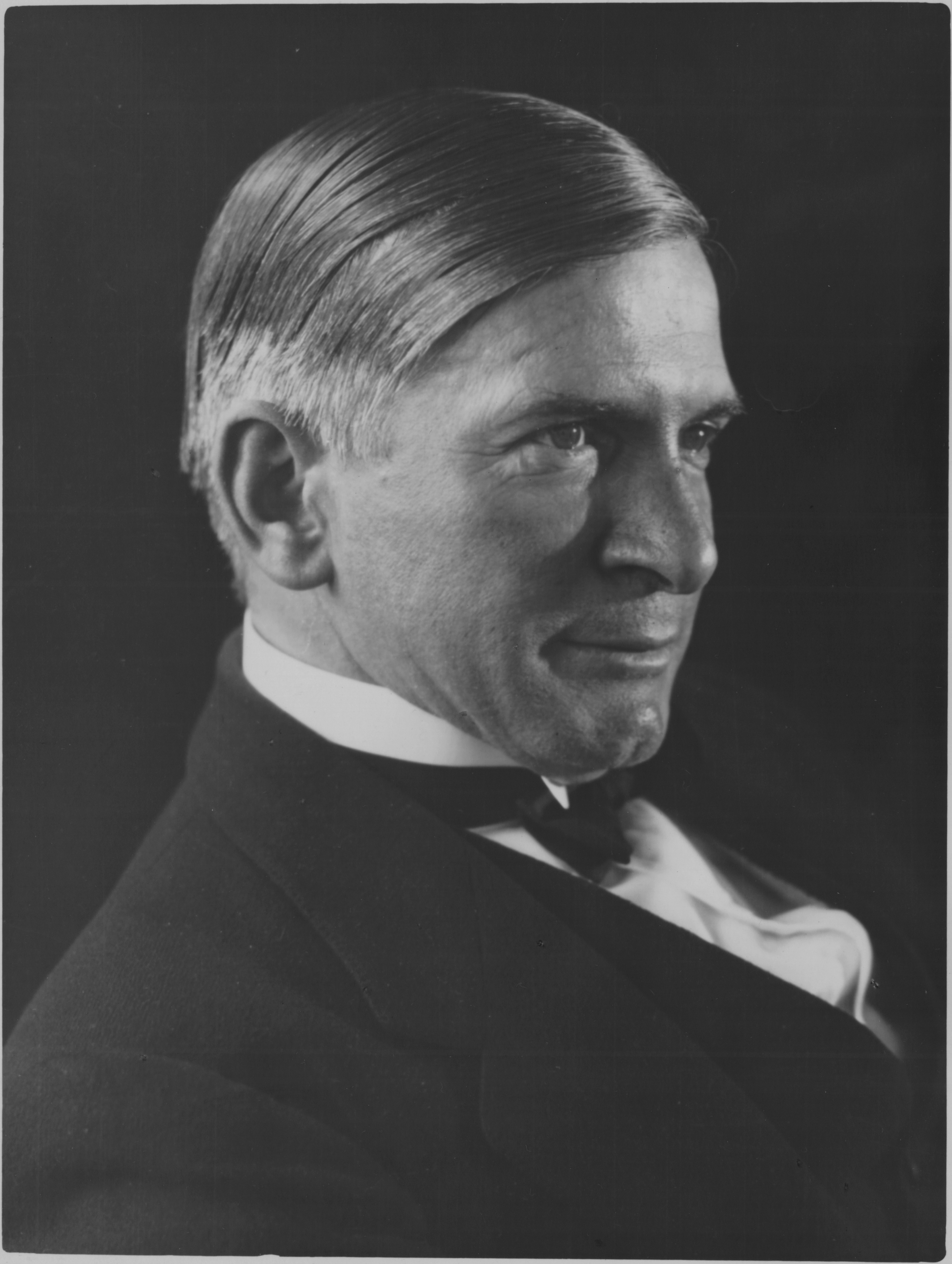
- Born: John Wentworth Russell; August 28, 1879; Binbrook, Ontario
- Died: 1959; Toronto, Ontario, Canada
- Education: Hamilton Art School; Art Students League, New York
- Notable work: A Modern Fantasy, shown at the 1927 C.N.E.
- Spouse(s): Helen Dryden (divorced); Anna MacVicar (m.1951)

John Wentworth Russell (1879–1959) was a Canadian painter with a wide range of subjects and media – portraits (child subjects were a specialty of his), landscapes, still life, and the nude as well as illustrations for magazines, such as Vogue. Russell’s large (243.8 x 218.4 cm) painting A Modern Fantasy, of a reclining female nude echoing Titian but realistically depicted and wearing a hat, caused a sensation when shown at the Canadian National Exhibition (C.N.E.) in Toronto in 1927. Although many adverse comments were published, Prime Minister Mackenzie King stated of the work: "1 saw the painting at the Ex and thought it a marvelous work.

== Career ==
John Wentworth Russell was born in Binbrook, Ontario and raised in southern Ontario. He showed an aptitude for drawing at a young age. After studying at the Hamilton Art School and Art Students League, New York (1898–1904), he moved to Paris, France to study and work and lived there intermittently, travelling and often returning to Toronto for commissions and for exhibitions with the Royal Canadian Academy (1905–1919). In 1906, he exhibited in the Paris Société des Artistes Français for the first time two paintings titled Portrait and L'enfant au Coq. He was said to be a disciple of the School of John Sargent and joined and exhibited at the Canadian Art Club in 1909, one of his paintings Mother and Son being purchased by the National Gallery of Canada that year. The Globe called the tactile or tangible quality of his work "exceptionally fine".

In 1911, he settled in Toronto where he had become known as a talented portrait artist, with many prominent subjects such as the Right Honourable Sir Wilfrid Laurier, Prime Minister (1919) in the House of Commons. In the same year, he left for New York, then went back to Toronto before moving to Paris for the next twenty years, exhibiting regularly at the Paris Société des Artistes Français. A Modern Fantasy, earned the highest honour there in 1927, contributing to its selection for exhibition at the CNE where it became a controversial issue that attracted a great deal of public attention.

Russell derided most schools and collectives, and publicly decried the growing Canadian interest in natural landscapes then being popularized by the Group of Seven, calling them the "jazz band of Canadian art". In 1932, he opened a studio and the Russell School of Fine Art in Toronto, teaching art to many students, among them Cleeve Horne. In 1934 and 1935, he showed his work at the Automotive Building of the C.N.E. In 1936, he painted his largest canvas ever, of the unveiling of the Canadian Vimy Memorial in France (14 feet long by 12 feet high) and oversaw its installation at his annual C.N.E. grounds showing. But he closed his School in 1939 and with the World War curtailed his usual travelling. He spent the war years painting and writing his memoirs. He held a solo show of his work at Mellors Fine Art Gallery on Yonge Street (1941).

His works are in such public collections as the National Gallery of Canada; the House of Commons; the Art Gallery of Ontario; the Government of Ontario collection; the Art Gallery of Hamilton; the Reading Museum & Town Hall, England, and elsewhere.

== Controversy ==
In 1927, the C.N.E. exhibition’s art gallery nearly tripled its attendance over the previous year, in part because of a series of reviews and letters in the Toronto newspapers concerned with several paintings depicting nude subjects. Russell's A Modern Fantasy was the chief work under discussion, praised by critics and art professionals and denigrated by individuals and various women’s organizations of Toronto. Contemporary critics suggest the painting offended in 1927 because of its "problematic sexuality", not unlike Manet's Olympia as well as its exhibition location in a building located on a midway.

Russell's A Modern Fantasy often has been discussed in articles and books, though more recently, as a milestone in the shift in moral standards and gender norms in the sexual history of Canada.

== Legacy ==
In 2010, a show titled The Group of One -- The Works of John Wentworth Russell, was exhibited at the Renaissance Gallery, Pender Island, British Columbia.
