= Frances Itani =

Canadian fiction writer, poet and essayist

Frances Susan Itani, née Hill (born August 25, 1942) is a Canadian fiction writer, poet and essayist. She is a Member of the Order of Canada.

== Biography ==
Itani was born in Belleville, Ontario, and grew up in Quebec. She studied nursing in Montreal and North Carolina, a profession which she taught and practised for eight years. However, after enrolling in a writing class taught by W. O. Mitchell, she decided to change careers.

She married Tetsuo (Ted) Itani, a retired Canadian Forces officer and humanitarian, in 1967. They resided in Ottawa, until his death due to a traumatic accident while out running.

Itani has published eighteen books, ranging from fiction and poetry to a children's book. Her 2003 novel Deafening was shortlisted for the International IMPAC Dublin Award, and won the Commonwealth Writers Prize, Caribbean and Canada region, and has been published in 16 countries.

== Awards ==
Deafening was shortlisted for the International IMPAC Dublin Award, and won the Commonwealth Writers Prize, Caribbean and Canada region.

Itani was the 2021 recipient of the Writers' Trust of Canada's annual Matt Cohen Award.

== Bibliography ==
=== Children's ===
- Linger By the Sea (1979) (illustrated by Molly Bobak)
- Best Friend Trouble (2014) (illustrated by Genevieve Despres)

=== Short stories ===
- Pack Ice (1989)
- Truth or Lies (1989)
- Man Without Face (1994)
- Poached Egg on Toast (2004)

=== Poetry ===
- A Season of Mourning
- No Other Lodgings (1978)
- Rentee Bay: poems from the Bay of Quinte, 1785-89 (1983)

=== Novels ===
- Leaning, Leaning Over Water (1998)
- Deafening (2003)
- Remembering the Bones (2007)
- Missing (2011)
- Requiem (2011)
- Tell (2014) (shortlisted for the Scotiabank Giller Prize)
- That's My Baby (2017)
- The Company We Keep (2020)
