= Aline Chrétien =

Canadian woman (1936–2020)

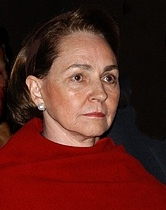
- Chrétien in 2003
- Born: Aline Chaîné; May 14, 1936; Saint-Boniface-de-Shawinigan, Quebec, Canada
- Died: September 12, 2020 (aged 84); Shawinigan, Quebec, Canada
- Known for: Spouse of the Prime Minister of Canada
- Spouse: Jean Chrétien (m. 1957)
- Children: 3, including France

Aline Chrétien (French pronunciation: [alin kʁetjɛ̃]; née Chaîné; May 14, 1936 – September 12, 2020) was the wife of Canada's 20th prime minister, Jean Chrétien. She previously worked as a secretary, payroll manager, and model. In her later life, she was a trained pianist with The Royal Conservatory of Music.

== Early life and family ==
Aline Chaîné was born on May 14, 1936, in Saint-Boniface-de-Shawinigan, Quebec, the eldest child of Yvonne (Bellemar) and Albert Chaîné. Her mother was a hairdresser; her father worked at a power plant. She left school at age 16 and never attended university but took correspondence courses while working as a secretary. She was also employed as a payroll manager and did some modelling for local clothing stores.

Chaîné married lawyer Jean Chrétien on September 10, 1957. They had two sons, Hubert and Michel Chrétien (adopted), and one daughter, France Chrétien Desmarais. After her husband was elected to Parliament, she taught herself English, Italian, and Spanish, and became fluent in those languages in addition to her native French.

== Spouse of the prime minister ==
Chrétien was active in a number of charitable organizations from the time that her husband was first elected to the House of Commons of Canada in 1963. In addition to her keen interest in languages, she took piano courses during her 50s and became an advocate for The Royal Conservatory of Music in Toronto. Jean Chrétien purchased a grand piano for her using the damages he was awarded in a libel case against The Globe and Mail.

On November 5, 1995, an intruder, André Dallaire, broke into the prime minister's residence at 24 Sussex Drive, in Ottawa, Ontario. Awakened next to her sleeping husband, Chrétien confronted the intruder at their bedroom door. Seeing that he was armed with a large knife, she slammed the door and locked it, then woke her husband.

Jean Chrétien often sought out his wife's advice. Maclean's magazine in 1996 listed her first among his most influential advisors, saying "Never mind calling her the power behind the throne—she shares the seat of power." In the same magazine in 2000, Allan Fotheringham described Jean and Aline Chrétien as the two "most powerful" politicians in Canada, above Eddie Goldenberg and Jean Pelletier.

Jean Chrétien has publicly stated that his wife was his key advisor. He once joked that Canada was run exclusively by women: the monarch (Queen Elizabeth II), the governor general (Adrienne Clarkson), and the chief justice (Beverley McLachlin) were all women, and Madame Chrétien was pulling the strings of the prime minister. He made similar jokes often, once telling a reporter that he did not know when the next election would be because he had not yet asked Aline to set a date.

In her role as the prime minister's spouse, Chrétien went to the memorial of the victim of the W. R. Myers High School shooting in 1999, along with Alberta Premier Ralph Klein, Opposition Leader Preston Manning, and the Attorney General of Canada Anne McLellan. She was awarded her first honorary degree from Laurentian University in 2003.

== Later years ==
On September 22, 2010, Chrétien was named as the first chancellor of Laurentian University, a bilingual educational institution in Sudbury, Ontario.

Chrétien suffered from Alzheimer's disease. She died on September 12, 2020, at her home in Lac des Piles near Shawinigan. She was 84 and had celebrated her 63rd wedding anniversary two days before. No cause of death was disclosed.

== See also ==
- Spouse of the prime minister of Canada
