= Paul Martin =

Prime Minister of Canada from 2003 to 2006

The Right Honourable Paul Martin PC CC KC
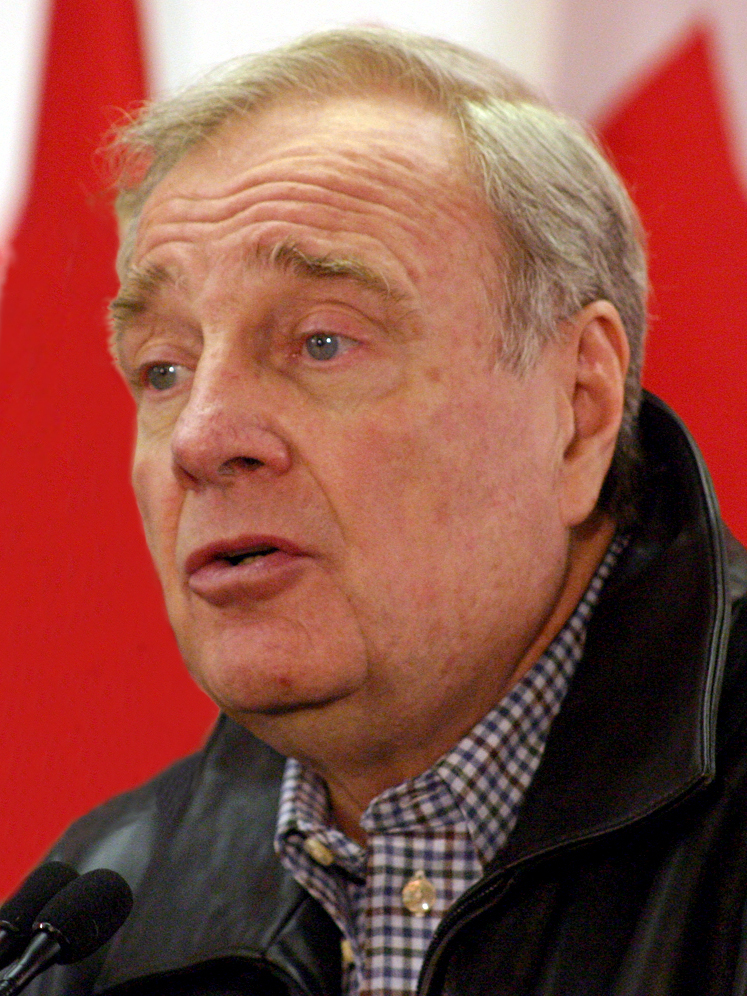
- Martin in 2006

21st Prime Minister of Canada
- In office December 12, 2003 – February 6, 2006
- Monarch: Elizabeth II
- Governors General: Adrienne Clarkson; Michaëlle Jean
- Deputy: Anne McLellan
- Preceded by: Jean Chrétien
- Succeeded by: Stephen Harper

Leader of the Liberal Party
- In office November 14, 2003 – March 19, 2006
- Deputy: Lucienne Robillard (Feb–Mar 2006)
- Preceded by: Jean Chrétien
- Succeeded by: Stéphane Dion (Note: Bill Graham served as interim leader from March 19 to December 2, 2006.)
Ministerial offices
Minister of Finance
In office November 4, 1993 – June 2, 2002
Prime Minister	Jean Chrétien
Preceded by	Gilles Loiselle
Succeeded by	John Manley
Minister responsible for the Federal Office of Regional Development – Quebec
In office November 4, 1993 – January 24, 1996
Prime Minister	Jean Chrétien
Preceded by	Jean Charest
Succeeded by	John Manley

Member of Parliament for LaSalle—Émard
- In office November 21, 1988 – October 14, 2008
- Preceded by: Riding established
- Succeeded by: Lise Zarac

Personal details
- Born: Paul Edgar Philippe Martin; August 28, 1938 (age 88) Windsor, Ontario, Canada
- Party: Liberal
- Spouse: Sheila Cowan (m. 1965)
- Children: 3
- Parent: Paul Martin Sr. (father)
- Education: University of Ottawa; University of Toronto (BA, LLB)
- Profession: Lawyer; businessman; author; politician

Paul Edgar Philippe Martin (French: [pɔl maʁtɛ̃]; born August 28, 1938), also known as Paul Martin Jr., is a Canadian lawyer, businessman, author, and retired politician who served as the 21st prime minister of Canada and the leader of the Leader of the Liberal Party from 2003 to 2006.

The son of former senator and secretary of state for external affairs Paul Martin Sr., Martin was born in Windsor, Ontario and was a lawyer from Ontario before he became president and chief executive officer of Canada Steamship Lines in 1973. He held that position until his election as a member of Parliament for the Montreal riding of LaSalle—Émard in 1988. Martin ran for leader of the Liberal Party in 1990, losing to Jean Chrétien. Martin became Chrétien's longtime rival for the leadership of the party, though he was appointed as minister of finance after the Liberal victory in the 1993 federal election.

As minister, Martin oversaw many changes in the financial structure of the Canadian government, and his policies had a direct effect on eliminating the country's chronic fiscal deficit by sharply cutting spending and reforming programs. In 2002, he was removed as finance minister as tensions with Chrétien reached their peak. Martin initially prepared to challenge Chrétien's leadership, but when Chrétien announced his intention to retire, Martin entered the 2003 Liberal Party of Canada leadership election. Martin won the leadership in a landslide and was sworn in as prime minister that December.

Martin led the Liberal Party in the 2004 federal election, in which the party retained power as a minority government, losing its majority amid the sponsorship scandal, which had begun to develop in the late 1990s. After the election, Martin's government signed the Kelowna Accord to improve the living conditions of Indigenous peoples and legalized same-sex marriage through the Civil Marriage Act. In 2005, after the Gomery Commission released new details about the sponsorship scandal, opposition parties in the House of Commons passed a motion of no confidence alleging government corruption, triggering the 2006 federal election. In that election, Martin's Liberals were defeated by the newly unified Conservative Party led by Stephen Harper, ending over 12 years of Liberal rule.

Shortly after the defeat, Martin stepped down as Liberal leader and declined to seek re-election in 2008. Evaluations of Martin's prime ministership have been mixed, whereas his tenure as finance minister has been viewed more favourably. Martin has participated in international initiatives, including Incentives for Global Health and the not-for-profit organization behind the Health Impact Fund, on whose advisory board he serves. He also sits as an adviser to Canada's Ecofiscal Commission.

== Early life ==
Martin was born at Hôtel-Dieu of St. Joseph Hospital in Windsor, Ontario, and grew up in Windsor and Ottawa. His father, Paul Martin Sr., a Franco-Ontarian of Irish and French descent, served 33 years as a member of the House of Commons of Canada and was a cabinet minister in the Liberal governments of Prime Ministers W. L. Mackenzie King, Louis St. Laurent, Lester B. Pearson, and Pierre E. Trudeau. His mother, Eleanor "Nell" Alice (née Adams), was of Scottish and Irish descent. He had one sister, Mary-Anne Bellamy, who was diagnosed with Crohn's disease at a young age. She died on July 20, 2011. Martin contracted polio in 1946 at the age of eight (like his father, who contracted the disease in 1907).

Martin briefly attended the University of Ottawa before transferring to St. Michael's College at the University of Toronto, where he graduated with a B.A. in history and philosophy in 1961. He was a member of the U of T Young Liberals during his time at the University of Toronto. He then attended the University of Toronto Faculty of Law, where he received an LL.B. in 1964. He was called to the Ontario bar in 1966.

On September 11, 1965, Martin married Sheila Ann Cowan, with whom he has three sons: Paul, Jamie and David.

== Business career ==
=== Board of directors ===
In 1969, Power Corporation took a controlling share in Canada Steamship Lines. On December 2, 1970, Paul Martin, the 32-year-old executive assistant to Power Corporation chief executive officer (CEO) Maurice Strong, was appointed to the CSL board of directors. In 1971, CSL minority shareholders sold outstanding shares to Power Corporation, making CSL a Power Corporation subsidiary.

=== Presidency ===
CSL suffered losses in 1972 when forced to cover unexpected cost overruns in the construction of three 80,000-ton ocean-going tankers at Davie Shipbuilding. On November 22, 1973, Martin was appointed president and CEO of the CSL Group. In 1974, CSL earnings were further hurt by an eight-week strike on the Great Lakes.

In 1976, Power Corporation reversed itself and took over the investment portfolio that had been sold to CSL five years earlier. CSL reverted to an operating division of Power Corporation.

== Early political career (1988–1993) ==
In 1988, Martin was elected as the Member of Parliament (MP) for the southwestern Montreal riding of LaSalle-Émard. He was re-elected at every election until he retired from politics.

In 1984, the Liberal Party was defeated under the leadership of John Turner, falling to just 40 seats. A group of young Liberals approached Martin as a possible candidate to replace Turner, and while he did not take part in an attempt to overthrow Turner, he did prepare to succeed him as leader if the position became vacant.

Martin was a candidate in the 1990 Liberal Party of Canada leadership election, losing to Jean Chrétien in a bitter race that resulted in lasting animosity between the two men and their supporters. A key moment in that race took place at an all-candidates debate in Montreal, where the discussion quickly turned to the Meech Lake Accord. Martin, favouring Meech, attempted to force Chrétien to abandon his nuanced position on the deal and declare whether he supported or opposed it. When Chrétien refused to endorse the deal, young Liberal delegates crowding the hall began to chant "vendu" ("sellout" in French) and "Judas" at Chrétien. Chrétien was upset by the response from the floor and by another similar outburst from Martin supporters at the convention when Chrétien accepted the party leadership. Jean Lapierre and his supporters, who supported Martin, wore black armbands at the convention to protest Chrétien's victory. The Meech Lake Accord was officially defeated just one day before the Liberal leadership was to be decided. In the House of Commons, Lapierre then crossed the floor to the newly formed Bloc Québécois.

After the leadership convention, Martin co-authored the election platform Creating Opportunity, colloquially known as the Red Book. The Liberal Party won a landslide majority in the 1993 election.

== Finance Minister (1993–2002) ==
After the Liberals formed the government, Martin was chosen as minister of finance by Prime Minister Chrétien. At the time, Canada had one of the highest budgetary deficits of the G7 countries. Standard & Poor's had lowered its rating on Canada's foreign-denominated government debt from AAA to AA-plus in 1992, and in 1994, Moody's lowered its rating on Canada's foreign currency debt from Aaa to Aa1, partly due to Canada's growing public debt. Early in his tenure as finance minister, Martin made substantial budget cuts that slowed economic growth, scaling down government to 1951 levels. In 1994–96, when these cuts were made, economic growth decreased by 3.5 percentage points, according to a study by CIBC-Wood Gundy. The resulting loss in tax revenue almost eliminated the savings made by the cuts and turned the economy away from the public sector toward the private sector. The cuts endangered the provinces' abilities to pay for social programs, health care, and public infrastructure. In response, the Bank of Canada lowered interest rates to avoid worsening a recession, contributing to strong economic growth and an increase in government revenue. In 1998, Martin introduced a balanced budget, an event that had occurred only twice in 36 years before 1997. In 2002, Moody's and Standard & Poor's restored Canada's domestic and foreign currency debt ratings to AAA.

During his tenure as finance minister, Martin was responsible for lowering Canada's debt-to-GDP ratio from a peak of 70 percent to about 50 percent in the mid-1990s. In December 2001, he was named a member of the World Economic Forum's "dream cabinet." The global business and financial body listed Martin along with United States Secretary of State Colin Powell and United Nations Secretary-General Kofi Annan as top world leaders.

During his tenure as finance minister, Martin also coordinated a series of meetings between the finance ministers of all provinces to discuss the pending crisis in the Canada Pension Plan (CPP). Consequently, Martin oversaw the creation of a general public consultation process in February 1996 that eventually led to major structural reform of the CPP. The results of this public consultation process were collected and analyzed by the Department of Finance. The process led to a proposal to overhaul the CPP, which was presented to Parliament and approved soon afterwards, averting a pension crisis.

While Martin's record as finance minister was lauded in business and financial circles, there were costs. Some of these took the form of reduced government services, affecting the operations of federal and provincial departments and their ability to fulfil their mandates. The effects were particularly noticeable in health care, where major reductions in federal funding to the provinces meant significant cuts in service delivery. Martin's use of contributors' funds from RCMP, military and civil service pension plans and Employment Insurance created further controversy. CAW economist Jim Stanford said that a combination of a spending freeze at 1994 levels and lower interest rates would have eliminated the deficit in two years through economic growth alone, without the reduction in services.

=== Relations with Chrétien ===
Chrétien and Martin frequently clashed while in office. It was reported that Chrétien often condemned Martin privately in bitter terms and had never forgiven Martin for running against him in the Liberal leadership convention of 1990. During that bitter contest, Martin had forced Chrétien to declare his opposition to the Meech Lake Accord and, as a result, Chrétien was generally unpopular in his home province for the next decade.

Even before the Liberals' second electoral victory in the 1997 election, there was much speculation in the media and in Ottawa that Martin wanted to succeed Chrétien and wanted to force him to retire. As the Liberals emerged with a smaller majority government after the 1997 election, it seemed unlikely that any opposition party could pose a serious challenge, but Martin began to gain support from those who disagreed with Chrétien. Chrétien, however, resolved to stay on after the Liberals were re-elected in 2000, having regained much of the ground lost in 1997. By this time, Martin had gained control of much of the party machinery.

== Becoming prime minister ==
The conflict between the two men reached a peak in 2002. Martin left cabinet and was replaced by John Manley as finance minister. There is some question about whether Martin resigned or Chrétien had him dismissed. Leaving cabinet may have benefited Martin's campaign, as he was no longer obligated to disclose his donors. Soon after, Martin declared his intention to run as leader of the Liberal Party at the next party convention. Over the summer of 2002, Martin toured the country campaigning to succeed Chrétien while his Liberal organizers prepared to challenge Chrétien's leadership during a review vote in January 2003. During the fall, Chrétien announced that he would step down in the spring of 2004 after less than half of caucus agreed to sign a commitment supporting him. The Liberal Party called a leadership convention for the fall of 2003, to be held in Toronto.

In his first speech as a leadership contender to students of York University's Osgoode Hall law school, Martin advocated to addressing what he called a democratic deficit by arguing that lawmakers in Canada are restricted by the Prime Minister Office to perform their duties. Some of the changes include freer votes, introducing an independent ethics commissioner, increasing the number of independent parliamentary committees and renewing the system for private members' bills.

Several other potential leadership contenders, such as Brian Tobin and Allan Rock, declined to enter the contest. John Manley's attacks on Martin's refusal to disclose his campaign contributors did little to dent the latter's commanding lead, and Manley eventually conceded the race. This left no strong candidate for Chrétien supporters to rally around, and some of them grudgingly voted for Martin.

On September 21, 2003, Martin easily defeated his sole remaining opponent, former deputy prime minister Sheila Copps, securing 93 percent of the party delegates. On November 14, 2003, he was declared the winner at the Liberal leadership convention, capturing 3,242 of 3,455 votes. He had won the leadership almost unopposed because of his hold on the party machinery and because Chrétien supporters did not rally around either of the leadership opponents.

Simon Fraser University professor Doug McArthur has noted that Martin's leadership campaign used aggressive tactics ahead of the 2003 leadership convention, attempting to end the contest before it began by creating the impression that his bid was too strong to challenge. McArthur blamed Martin's tactics for the subsequent decline in Liberal support, arguing that the tactics discouraged activists who did not support Martin.

== Prime Minister (2003–2006) ==
=== Majority government and sponsorship controversy ===
On December 12, 2003, Martin was appointed by then-Governor General Adrienne Clarkson as the 21st prime minister of Canada. When sworn in as prime minister, Martin held the flag that flew on Parliament Hill when the elder Martin died. Both father and son had served as Cabinet ministers and contested the Liberal leadership on multiple occasions; their attempts from 1948 to 1990 were unsuccessful. Martin's election as leader and becoming prime minister was described as fulfilling a family dream. Both also earned the honorific prefix The Right Honourable. Politically, Paul Sr. was among the more left-wing members of the party, while Paul Jr. is considered to be on the party's right wing.

When he was sworn in, Martin's new cabinet retained only half the ministers from Chrétien's government, a noteworthy break in tradition from previous instances where a retiring prime minister handed over power to his successor as party leader. Martin and his supporters exercised control over the riding nomination process, breaking with the precedent to automatically sign the nomination papers of backbenchers and former ministers who wanted to run for re-election. Although these were signs of open party infighting, they had little impact on Martin's popularity, with several pundits suggesting that the cabinet changes were intended to distinguish Martin's government from Chrétien's decade in office. Martin declined to appoint leadership contestants John Manley and Sheila Copps to cabinet.

Martin and the Liberals were adversely affected by a report from Auditor General Sheila Fraser on February 9, 2004, indicating that sponsorship contracts designed to increase the federal government's status in Quebec resulted in little or no work being done. Many of the agencies had Liberal ties, and roughly $100 million of the $250 million in program spending went missing. The scandal hurt Martin's popularity, especially in Quebec, where Bloc Québécois leader Gilles Duceppe accused Martin of planning to widen the St. Lawrence seaway to benefit his own Canada Steamship Lines. The scandal also raised doubts about Martin's recommendations for cabinet appointments, prompting speculation that Martin was removing Chrétien's supporters from the government to distance the Liberals from the scandal. Martin acknowledged that there was political direction but denied involvement in, or knowledge of, the sponsorship contracts. He called a judicial inquiry to investigate what became known as the sponsorship scandal and appointed John Gomery to head it.

During his term, Martin appeared as himself in several fictional comedy programs, including an episode of the CTV sitcom Corner Gas in 2006 and the CBC mockumentary series Jimmy MacDonald's Canada in 2005.

==== 2004 federal election ====
The Liberals were facing a newly unified Conservative Party led by Stephen Harper, while the Bloc Québécois and NDP were also buoyed by the sponsorship scandal. Martin advised Governor General Adrienne Clarkson to call a election for June 28, 2004.

The Liberals were also hampered by their inability to raise enough campaign funds to compete after Chrétien passed a bill in 2003 that banned corporate donations, even though the Liberals had enjoyed much of this funding due to the then-divided opposition parties. It has been suggested that Chrétien, who had done nothing about election financing for his 10 years in office, could be seen as the idealist as he retired, while his rival and successor Martin would have the burden of having to fight an election under the strict new rules.

An unpopular provincial budget by Liberal Premier Dalton McGuinty, who broke a pledge not to raise taxes, hurt the federal party's polling numbers in Ontario, as did a weak performance from Martin in the leaders' debates. The Conservatives soon took the lead, prompting some predictions of an imminent Harper government. The Liberals managed to narrow the gap and eventually regain momentum. Martin won a plurality of seats, allowing the Liberals to remain in government, though with a minority of seats, the first since Joe Clark's tenure in 1979–80.

=== Minority government ===
The Martin government faced combined challenges from Quebec separatism and criticism arising from the sponsorship scandal. The first test of the Liberal minority came following the Speech from the throne on October 5, 2004. The Bloc Québécois moved an amendment to the speech challenging the government over provincial jurisdiction. The Conservatives supported the amendment, but the NDP opposed it. The government avoided defeat on the confidence vote after Martin called Harper and negotiated a last-minute agreement to soften the motion's wording. The government faced another hurdle when the Conservatives announced their own plan to move an amendment to the speech. Harper denied that the Tories intended to bring down the government. The government avoided defeat for a second time after the Liberals reached a deal with the opposition parties. Don Boudria, the Liberals' Chrétien-era House leader, likened the brinkmanship in the first few weeks of the 38th Parliament to a game of Russian roulette.

==== Economic policy ====
Martin invested heavily in Quebec, for example with the Bombardier Inc. C Series project, which was later taken over by Airbus after its manufacturer encountered financial difficulties; it was renamed the Airbus A220. By June 2005, Martin had given the Federation of Canadian Municipalities a GST rebate and was preparing to allocate a portion of the federal gasoline tax to municipalities; the programme was called "New Deal for Cities and Communities". The initiative dated back to his tenure as minister of finance, spurred by continued criticism from academics, some of whom noted in 2004 that "[u]nlike the federal and provincial governments, municipalities cannot borrow for operating purposes; they can only do so for capital expenditures."

===== Health care funding =====
At the First Ministers' Meeting of September 13–15, 2004, Martin and the provincial premiers reached an agreement on increased funding for health care. This 10-year plan outlined $18 billion in increased transfers to the provinces over six years, notably through increases in the CHT:

- The CHT was to be increased by $3 billion in 2004–05 and $2 billion in 2005–06;
- A new CHT base set at $19 billion starting in 2005–06, greater than suggested in the Romanow Report;
- An escalation factor set at 6% starting in 2006–07.

===== Equalization =====
Martin also introduced changes to the equalization program, under which the federal government is constitutionally obligated to redistribute federal revenue to provinces having less ability to raise revenues through taxation than wealthier provinces. The goal is to ensure uniformity of public service provision across the nation. This was received well in "have-not" provinces, but Nova Scotia and Newfoundland and Labrador sought to retain income from natural resources on federal marine territory that would generally be taken, or 'clawed back', by the federal treasury in lieu of equalization payments. In the 2004 federal election campaign, Harper provided a written promise that, under a Conservative government, Newfoundland and Labrador and Nova Scotia would receive 100 percent of the revenue generated from their natural resources without an equalization clawback, a promise he did not fulfil after becoming prime minister. NDP leader Jack Layton followed suit soon after with a similar guarantee, and later Martin promised that under a Liberal government both provinces would receive the same deal, except only for oil resources. Negotiations over the agreement were contentious, with Newfoundland and Labrador Premier Danny Williams at one point ordering all Canadian flags removed from provincial government buildings in December 2004. The dispute was resolved when the federal government agreed to Martin's original campaign promise.

===== 2005 budget =====
The 2005 federal budget was presented in the House of Commons on February 23, 2005. The budget included an array of new spending for the Armed Forces, the environment and a national child-care program.

Public hearings of the Gomery Commission inquiry into the sponsorship scandal involving alleged kickbacks and "donations" from Quebec advertising agencies and corporations to Liberal Party operatives led to a drop in the Liberal Party's popularity. The minority government faced a threat of defeat as the Conservatives threatened to force an election using an "opposition day", when opposition parties can set Parliament's agenda. The Conservatives would use this time to hold a vote of no confidence in order to topple Martin's government. To avoid this, Martin removed all opposition days from the schedule and made a televised appearance on April 21, 2005, to attempt to gain support from the Canadian people to let the inquiry run its course before an election was called. In the rebuttal speeches by the opposition party leaders, Layton offered his party's support provided that the government made major budget concessions, such as cancelling the proposed corporate tax cuts. Days later, the Liberals took the NDP up on their offer and negotiated tax cut deferments and new spending initiatives. Among the new commitments was aid for Sudan, which Sudan's officials turned down as Martin did not consult them about it beforehand. This aid was attacked as a perceived attempt to win the vote of a single independent MP, former Liberal David Kilgour. Kilgour nevertheless voted against the government.

In May, Parliament passed a motion asking one of its committees to express a lack of confidence in the government. The Liberals dismissed this as a procedural matter, causing some to accuse them of governing unlawfully by ignoring parliamentary tradition. The Conservatives and Bloc interpreted it as a vote of no confidence, and they combined their votes to shut down the House of Commons early for two days in a row. The speaker of the House of Commons later ruled in favour of the Liberal stance.

On May 17, 2005, MP Belinda Stronach crossed the floor from the Conservative Party and joined the Liberal Party to become Minister of Human Resources and Skills Development. Martin claimed Stronach's move was due to concerns over the direction the Conservative Party was taking; others accused Stronach of political opportunism. The event changed the balance of power in the House of Commons in favour of the government. This, together with the support of independent MP Chuck Cadman, resulted in a tie during a May 2005 confidence vote, requiring Peter Milliken, Speaker of the House, to cast the deciding vote. He voted with the government, following the convention that the speaker votes to allow debate to continue, which allowed the budget to pass through the House on May 19, 2005.

==== Social policy ====
Same-sex marriage proved to be a defining issue of Martin's mandate. Martin opposed same-sex marriage in a 1999 vote on the issue along with a majority of MPs, but changed his stance on the issue in 2004, citing recent court rulings and his personal belief that same-sex marriage was primarily a human rights issue. In the midst of various court rulings in 2003 and 2004 that allowed for the legalization of same-sex marriages in seven provinces and one territory, the government proposed a bill to legalize same-sex marriage across Canada. The House of Commons passed the Civil Marriage Act in a late-night vote in late June 2005, before Parliament adjourned. The Senate passed it in July 2005, and it received Royal Assent on July 20 of the same year. This made Canada the fourth country in the world to allow same-sex marriages.

In November 2005, the Martin government reached an agreement with Canada's provinces, territories, First Nations, Métis and Inuit. Known as the Kelowna Accord, it aimed to eliminate the gaps between Aboriginal and non-Aboriginal Canadians in health, education, housing and economic opportunity.

==== Foreign relations ====
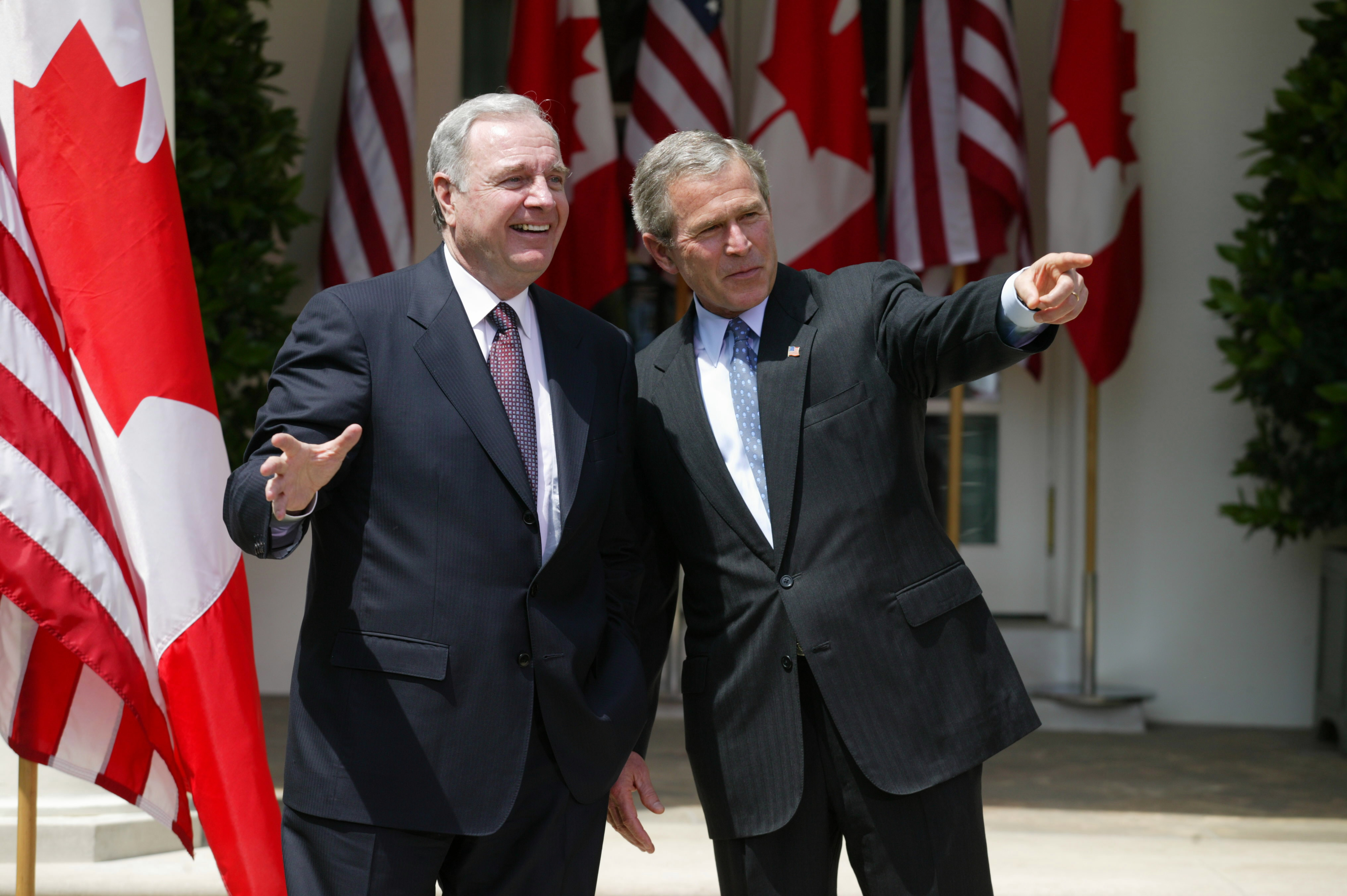
Martin alongside U.S. president George W. Bush, April 30, 2004

On February 24, 2005, Foreign Affairs Minister Pierre Pettigrew told the House of Commons that Canada would not participate in the American National Missile Defense Program and that he expected to be consulted in the case of a missile being launched over Canadian airspace. Martin's decision was praised by some, while others viewed it as distancing Canada from the U.S. His government continued to cooperate with the United States on border control, refugee claimants, and defence, and he appointed seasoned Liberal politician Frank McKenna as Canada's ambassador to Washington.

Martin was criticized for failing to reach a foreign-aid target of 0.7 percent of GDP, most notably by Bono of Irish rock group U2 (who claimed that he was going to "kick [Martin's] butt" over the issue). Martin later responded that, in his view, many foreign leaders had made pledges that were too fanciful and that he would only commit to targets that he knew his government could be held accountable for.

Martin became involved in a diplomatic row with the United States administration after he and Bill Clinton accused the U.S. of disregarding global environmental concerns. Martin rejected U.S. ambassador David Wilkins's rebuke and said he was standing up for Canada's interests over softwood and other issues.

Martin promoted the expansion of the G8 into the G20, a larger group of twenty nations, initially at the level of finance ministers and central bankers, with Martin as its inaugural chair, and later, amid the 2008 global financial crisis, at the level of national leaders. He also forged a closer relationship with the People's Republic of China by announcing the strategic partnership initiative during PRC President Hu Jintao's state visit to Canada in September 2005.

==== Appointment of Governor General ====
On August 4, 2005, the government announced that Martin had advised Queen Elizabeth II to appoint Michaëlle Jean as governor general. Reactions to the appointment were mixed: some welcomed it, while others raised concerns over allegations that her husband had dined with former members of the terrorist organization FLQ and supported Quebec separatism. Following her appointment, she reaffirmed her commitment to federalism, and the controversy subsided.

==== Fall of government ====
The first volume of the Gomery Report, released on November 1, 2005, cleared Martin of any wrongdoing while assigning Chrétien some responsibility for inadequate oversight, although it acknowledged that Chrétien had no knowledge of the scandal. On June 26, 2008, Chrétien was cleared of all allegations of involvement in the scandal.

A Canadian judge issued a gag order that barred Canadian media from covering the hearings of the Gomery Inquiry. Despite this, leaked information circulated after being published on an American blog, Captain's Quarters.

After the Gomery findings, NDP leader Jack Layton notified the Liberals of conditions for the NDP's continued support; the precise terms are unclear, but the two parties were unable to come to an agreement. An opposition proposal to schedule an election for February 2006 in return for passing several pieces of legislation did not materialize. The Conservatives, supported by the other two opposition parties (the NDP and Bloc Québécois), introduced a motion of no confidence against the Martin government. The motion passed on November 28 by a count of 171–133, defeating the government, after which the governor general issued election writs for a vote to be held on January 23, 2006.

Some commentators described Martin's tenure as prime minister as unfocused and indecisive, with the Canadian correspondent of The Economist reporting that he was being called "Mr. Dithers" in Ottawa.

==== 2006 federal election ====
Before the campaign and when the writs were issued, opinion polling indicated the Liberals were ahead of the Conservatives by 2–10 percentage points in popular support (November 30, 2005: Liberals 35%, Conservatives 30%). But the Liberal lead did not last. They planned little campaigning during December, allowing the Conservatives to take the initiative in rolling out policy ideas. Several early campaign missteps drew attention from the news media. One example was Liberal Party strategist Scott Reid's suggestion that parents might buy beer and popcorn with the Conservatives' child care subsidy, although Martin declined to apologize. Martin was also criticized for portraying himself as the defender of Canadian unity; some opponents said that the election was not a referendum while others pointed to the sponsorship scandal.

Near the end of December, the Liberals faced a Royal Canadian Mounted Police criminal investigation into the leaking of news of a federal tax change for income trusts. This again brought the sponsorship scandal to public attention at a time when Martin planned to make important policy announcements. Under constant campaign pressure by all opposition parties casting Martin and the Liberals as corrupt, Liberal support fell to as low as 26% in early January 2006. The decline was not halted even by an election platform booklet.

During the televised campaign debates, Martin sometimes stuttered and appeared flustered. During one debate, Martin made a surprise pledge that he would eliminate the notwithstanding clause; the Conservatives pointed out that this was not one of the announced Liberal campaign promises.

In an attempt to sway voter sentiment in the final two weeks of the campaign, the Liberals prepared a series of attack ads. One ad, which was not aired, was widely criticized as disrespectful towards the military. It overshadowed the other ads and prompted Martin to defend it rather than release new policies. During the last week, Martin was forced to defend Harper after the latter was called a separatist by Canadian Auto Workers union leader Buzz Hargrove. In another tactic similar to the 2004 campaign, Hargrove urged all progressive voters to unite under the Liberal banner in English Canada and the Bloc Québécois in Quebec to stop the Conservatives, hoping to attract voters who were leaning towards the NDP. However, New Democrat leader Jack Layton responded by focusing his attacks on Liberal corruption.

In the end, the Conservatives won a plurality of votes and seats, finishing 31 seats short of a majority. The Liberals held their base of support in Ontario, with 54 seats of the 103 in the province. The Liberals lost a number of seats in Quebec, winning only 13 of the 75 seats in the province, down from 21 in 2004, while the Conservatives won 10 seats there. The Liberals did not improve their standings in the western provinces, winning only 14 of the 92 seats, the same number as in 2004.

Shortly after midnight on January 24, 2006, after it became clear that the Conservatives were on their way to a plurality, Martin conceded defeat. (Near the end of the 2004 election, Martin and Harper both pledged that they would not form a government unless they won a plurality of seats.) Martin surprised many by announcing his resignation as party leader, saying "I will continue to represent with pride the people of LaSalle—Émard, but I will not take our party into another election as leader." The next day, Martin officially informed Governor General Michaëlle Jean of his intention to resign as prime minister. Jean asked Harper to form a government later that day. Martin remained as prime minister until the Harper minority government was sworn in on February 6, 2006.

=== Supreme Court appointments ===
Martin chose the following jurists to be appointed as justices of the Supreme Court of Canada by the Governor General:

- Rosalie Abella (October 4, 2004 – July 1, 2021)
- Louise Charron (October 4, 2004 – August 30, 2011)

== Return to the back benches (2006–2008) ==
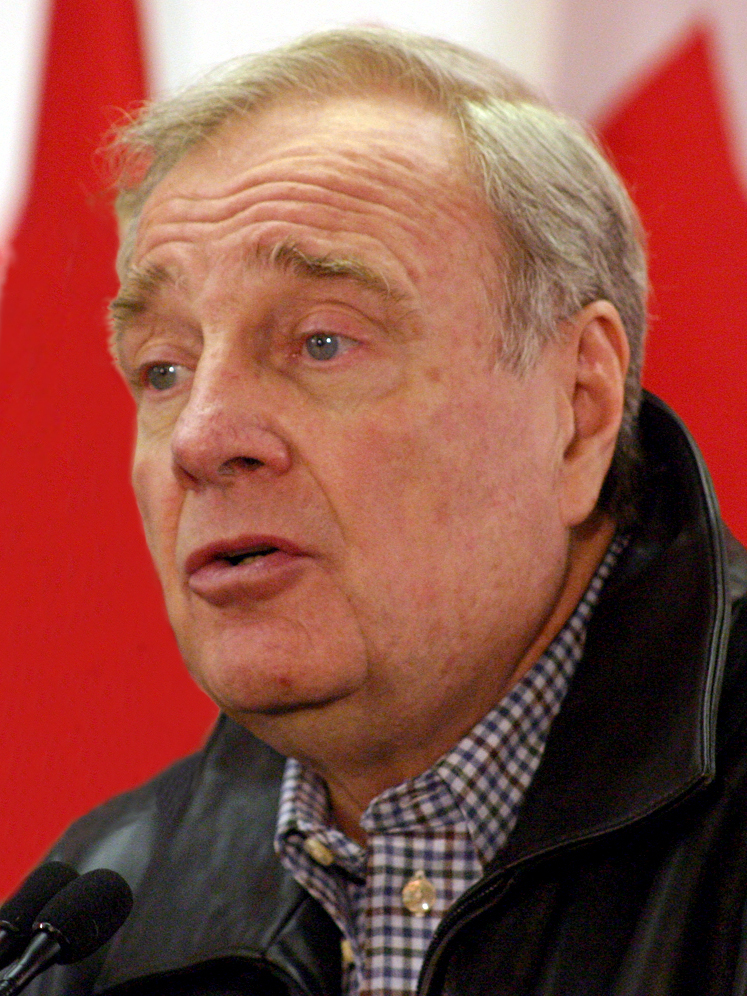
Martin in 2006

Martin, the first defeated prime minister to retain his seat but decline to become Leader of the Opposition, stepped down as parliamentary leader of his party on February 1. The Liberal caucus appointed Bill Graham, MP for Toronto Centre and outgoing Defence Minister, as his interim successor.

Martin temporarily remained the nominal leader of the Liberal Party until March 18, 2006, when he submitted his resignation to party executives, who handed that post to Graham on an interim basis until the next leadership convention could be held. At the meeting where Martin tendered his resignation, the date for the leadership convention to select his successor was set for the weekend of December 2–3, 2006. According to media reports, Martin decided to move up the date of his resignation to end speculation that he might lead the Liberals into another election if Stephen Harper's minority government were to fall prior to the Liberal leadership convention. This began a trend of high turnover among permanent Liberal leaders, in contrast to their predecessors who usually served through two or more elections, including Pierre Trudeau and Jean Chrétien, each of whom led the party for over a decade.

At the Liberal convention in Montreal, Martin was officially neutral in the contest. The party's tribute to Martin was hosted by former Olympian Mark Tewksbury. Martin's press secretary denied that the tribute was low-key due to the sponsorship scandal and lingering bitterness inside the party, saying that the former prime minister wanted a simple evening. In his farewell speech, Martin paid homage to Chrétien, though the latter was not present for the event, and urged the Liberals to emerge united from the convention. Stéphane Dion was elected Liberal leader from a field of eight candidates.

During his final years in public office after resigning as prime minister, Martin was a backbencher, devoting his time to projects related to improving educational opportunities for Indigenous people (the Martin Aboriginal Education Initiative) and protecting the Congo Basin rainforest. In the 2008 federal election, Martin did not run for re-election to Parliament.

== Retirement (2008–present) ==
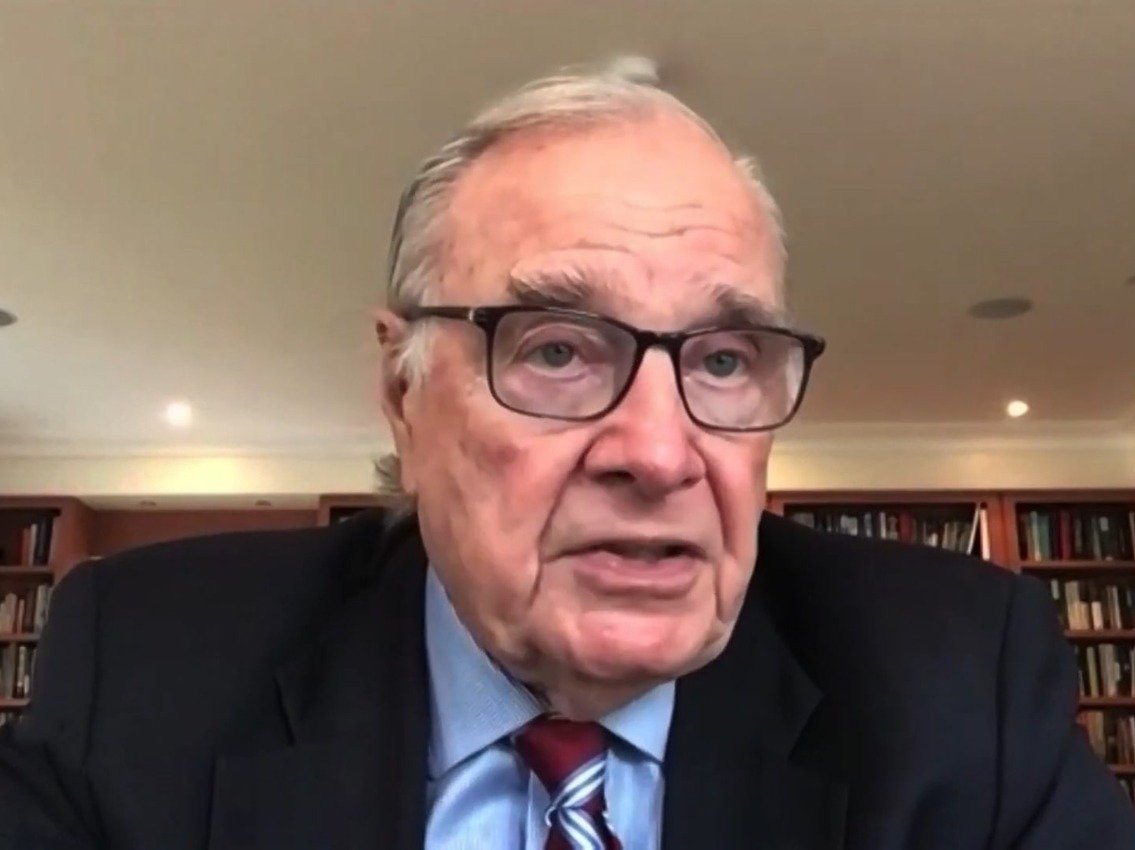
Martin in 2021

In November 2008, CTV reported that Martin would be a member of a four-person council of economic advisers to a coalition government formed by the Liberals and the NDP if they succeeded in toppling the Harper government. However, the proposed coalition collapsed, as outgoing Liberal leader Stéphane Dion was quickly forced out and replaced by Michael Ignatieff, who distanced the party from the coalition.

Martin published his memoirs, Hell Or High Water: My Life In And Out of Politics (ISBN 0771056923), in late 2008. Published by McClelland & Stewart, the book draws heavily upon interviews conducted by Sean Conway, a former Ontario Liberal provincial cabinet minister, which were carried out for Library and Archives Canada.

Martin was asked by Kofi Annan (then secretary-general of the United Nations), Gordon Brown (then prime minister of the United Kingdom), and other international politicians and diplomats to help African countries develop their economic potential.

In 2009, Martin was co-chair of the Congo Basin Forest Fund, along with Nobel Peace Prize laureate Professor Wangari Maathai, to address global warming and poverty issues in a ten-nation region in Africa.

In September 2022, Martin attended Elizabeth II's state funeral, along with other former Canadian prime ministers.

After his retirement from active Canadian politics, Martin was an adviser to the International Monetary Fund and to the Coalition for Dialogue on Africa. He also worked with the Martin Family Initiative, which assists First Nations youth. He lives in Knowlton, Quebec.

== Honours ==

Ribbon	Description	Notes
	Companion of the Order of Canada (C.C.)	Awarded on November 3, 2011; Invested on May 25, 2012
	125th Anniversary of the Confederation of Canada Medal	1993; As an elected member of the House of Commons of Canada, Martin was entitled to receive the medal as a member of the Canadian order of precedence.
	Queen Elizabeth II Golden Jubilee Medal for Canada	2002; As a member of Her Majesty's Privy Council for Canada and an elected member of the House of Commons of Canada, Paul Martin, then styled "The Honourable", was entitled to receive the medal as a member of the Canadian order of precedence.
	Queen Elizabeth II Diamond Jubilee Medal for Canada	2012

- Prenominal title "The Honourable" and postnominal "PC", for life upon being made a member of the Queen's Privy Council for Canada, November 4, 1993
- Upgraded prenominal title "The Right Honourable", for life upon becoming prime minister, December 12, 2003

Coat of arms of Paul Martin
Crest A demi-lion Or holding in its dexter paw a spray of shamrock, thistle and lily Azure and resting its sinister paw on a closed book proper bound Gules; Escutcheon Per saltire Gules and Argent the mark of the Prime Ministership of Canada (four maple leaves conjoined in cross) within an orle of hands wrists inward, all counterchanged; Supporters Two Siberian tigers proper winged in the style of the Pacific Coast First Nations Sable embellished Argent and Gules, each gorged with a collar of cedar branches Or pendent therefrom a bezant charged with a ship's wheel Azure and standing on the deck of a ship Gules rising above barry wavy Argent and Azure; Motto PRIMUM PATRIA ET FAMILIA (Latin for 'Country And Family First')

The Canada Steamship Lines Trillium-class freighter Rt. Hon. Paul E. Martin is named after him.

== Honorary degrees ==
Location	Date	School	Degree
Quebec	November 1998	Concordia University	Doctor of Laws (LL.D)
Ontario	June 2001	Wilfrid Laurier University	Doctor of Laws (LL.D)
Ontario	June 14, 2007	University of Windsor	Doctor of Laws (LL.D)
Quebec	May 30, 2009	Bishop's University	Doctor of Civil Law (DCL)
Ontario	May 28, 2010	Queen's University	Doctor of Laws (LL.D)
Ontario	June 18, 2010	University of Western Ontario	Doctor of Laws (LL.D)
Ontario	June 3, 2011	University of Toronto	Doctor of Laws (LL.D)
Ontario	June 16, 2011	McMaster University	Doctor of Laws (LL.D)
Ontario	June 13, 2012	Nipissing University	Doctor of Education (D.Ed.)
British Columbia	Fall 2012	University of British Columbia	Doctor of Laws (LL.D)
Ontario	June 1, 2013	Lakehead University	Doctor of Laws
Ontario	2013	University of Ottawa	
New Brunswick	2013	University of New Brunswick	Doctor of Laws (LL.D)
Israel	2013	University of Haifa	Doctor of Philosophy (Ph.D.)
New Brunswick	2014	Mount Allison University	Doctor of Laws (LL.D)
Nova Scotia	October 2014	Dalhousie University	Doctor of Laws (LL.D)
Manitoba	May 27, 2016	Brandon University	Doctor of Laws (LL.D)
Quebec	June 7, 2017	McGill University	Doctor of Laws (LL.D)
Ontario	June 9, 2017	Trent University	Doctor of Laws (LL.D)
Ontario	June 14, 2019	Carleton University	Doctor of Laws (LL.D)
Alberta	October 19, 2019	University of Lethbridge	Doctor of Laws (LL.D)
Ontario	June 19, 2020	Brock University	Doctor of Laws (LL.D)

== See also ==
- List of prime ministers of Canada

Party political offices
Preceded by Jean Chrétien	Leader of the Liberal Party; 2003–2006	Succeeded by Bill Graham; Acting
27th Canadian Ministry (2003–2006) – Cabinet of Paul Martin
Cabinet post (1)
Predecessor	Office	Successor
Jean Chrétien	Prime Minister of Canada; 2003–2006	Stephen Harper
26th Canadian Ministry (1993–2003) – Cabinet of Jean Chrétien
Cabinet post (1)
Predecessor	Office	Successor
Gilles Loiselle	Minister of Finance; 1993–2002	John Manley
Order of precedence
Preceded by Jean Chrétien as Former prime minister	Canadian order of precedence as Former prime minister	Succeeded by Stephen Harper as Former prime minister
