= Geills Turner =

Canadian political spouse (born 1937)

- Born: Geills McCrae Kilgour; December 23, 1937 (age 88); Winnipeg, Manitoba, Canada
- Education: McGill University; Harvard Business School
- Known for: Spouse of the Prime Minister of Canada
- Spouse: John Turner (m. 1963; died 2020)
- Children: 4
- Relatives: David Kilgour (brother); John McCrae (great-uncle)

Geills "Jill" McCrae Turner (née Kilgour; born December 23, 1937) is the widow of John Turner, the 17th Prime Minister of Canada.

== Early life and work ==
Turner, the eldest of three children, was born in Winnipeg, Manitoba. She is the grand-niece of John McCrae, author of the poem In Flanders Fields, and the sister of long time Alberta member of Parliament David Kilgour. Her father was David Kilgour, Sr., who was the chief executive officer of Great West Life Assurance Company. Turner grew up in a wealthy family. She excelled in science and mathematics, graduating from McGill University with a degree in math and physics. She enrolled in the post-graduate business administration course at Harvard Business School. After graduating from Harvard, she left the United States since investment firms in New York City were not interested in hiring a woman. Turner moved to Montreal to work for IBM. Author Gordon Donaldson called her an "upper-crust pretty [girl]".

She met John Turner when she was a campaign worker for his first election campaign and she "brought computers into Turner's campaign." They married in 1963 and had four children: Elizabeth (born 1964), Michael (born 1965), David (1968–2021), and James Andrew (born 1972).

== Spouse of the prime minister ==
Her husband served as prime minister of Canada from June 30 to September 17, 1984.

The Canadian Broadcasting Corporation states that "she was not keen to subsume her personality to further her husband’s goals, and for the most part stayed out of the spotlight." She also did not like the way she was portrayed in the press and therefore tried to stay away from it. In his book Birds of a Feather: The Press and the Politicians, Allan Fotheringham claimed that Turner tried to exact her revenge on the press during the 1988 election campaign by secretly taking photographs of journalists partying on a campaign bus, with an eye toward publishing them in a magazine. The photographs were never subsequently published, however, and Fotheringham states that John Turner himself most likely killed the idea.

== Later life ==
After the family returned to Toronto, Turner enrolled in a four-year photography program at Ryerson University.

In 2001, Turner made news when she crashed her minivan and was charged for careless driving. She stated that she had momentarily stopped driving responsibly to save her dog.

In March 2008, Turner brought an action in the Ontario Superior Court of Justice against the City of Guelph, claiming ownership of several of John McCrae's wartime medals, which had been donated to the McCrae House in 1997 and 2005. She was seeking to have personal possession of the medals. The action was settled in 2012 with an agreement for the medals to remain with the museum.

== See also ==
- Spouse of the prime minister of Canada
