= Laureen Harper =

Canadian graphic designer (born 1963)

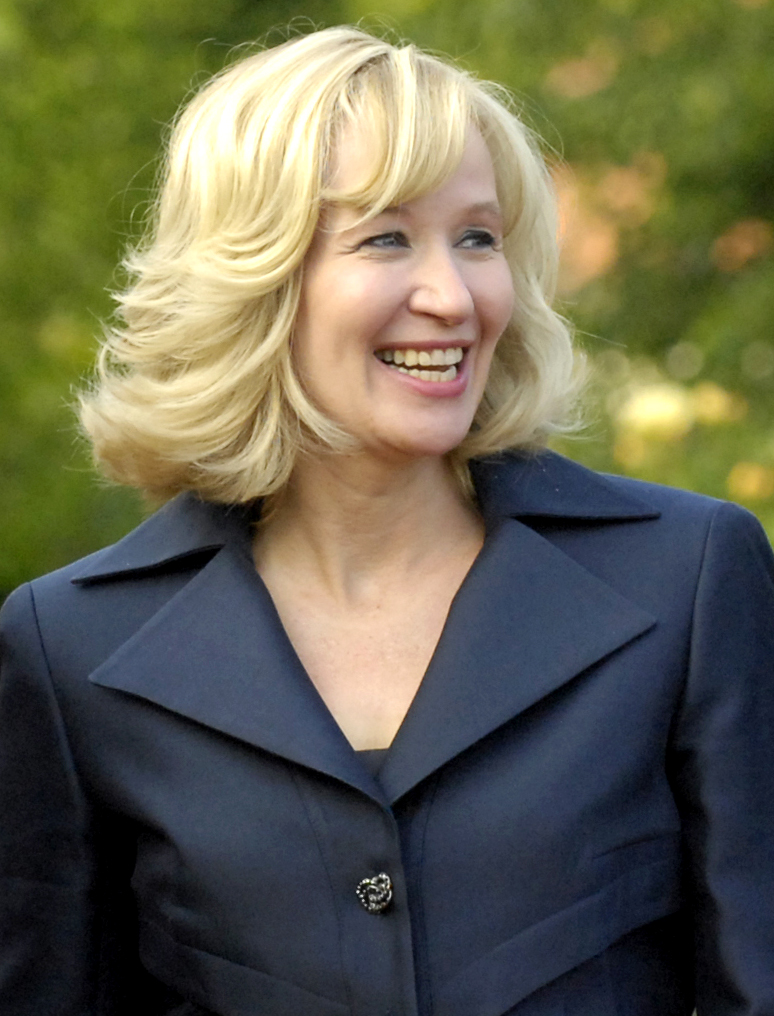
- Harper at the G8 summit, June 2007
- Born: Laureen Ann Teskey; June 23, 1963 (age 63); Turner Valley, Alberta, Canada
- Education: Southern Alberta Institute of Technology
- Occupation: Graphic designer
- Known for: Spouse of the Prime Minister of Canada
- Spouses: Neil Fenton (m. 1985; div. 1988) Stephen Harper (m. 1993)
- Children: 2

Laureen Ann Harper (née Teskey; born June 23, 1963) is a Canadian graphic designer. She is married to Canada's 22nd prime minister, Stephen Harper and has two children, Benjamin Harper and Rachel Harper.

== Life and career ==
The eldest of three, Laureen Ann Teskey was born in Turner Valley, a rural town southwest of Calgary, to rancher parents who owned an electrical contracting company. Her parents, Barbara and Dennis Teskey, divorced in 1991, after 29 years. After graduating from Oilfields High School, she attended the Southern Alberta Institute of Technology where she studied journalism and photography. Her sister, Elan Harper, is a political strategist and Conservative candidate for Calgary Confederation in the next federal election.

She was first married to New Zealander Neil Fenton from April 1985 to 1988. Teskey joined the Reform Party of Canada in the late 1980s. She met Stephen Harper in 1990 while working for GTO Printing, a computer graphics firm operating in Calgary that helped create professional graphs and tables for Harper's major paper for his master's degree in economics at the University of Calgary. They married on December 11, 1993.

=== Surname ===
There was initially confusion in the Canadian media about which surname Laureen Harper uses — at different times, media references to her have called her Teskey, Harper, or Teskey Harper (not hyphenated). She used the name "Laureen Teskey" after her 1993 marriage to Stephen Harper, but after her husband's victory in the 2006 federal election, she began using the name "Laureen Harper" in her public role as a spouse of the Prime Minister.

=== Campaigning ===
When her husband ran in the 2006 elections, she campaigned alongside him. She was frequently seen at the podium on behalf of and with her husband, Stephen Harper.

=== Public life ===
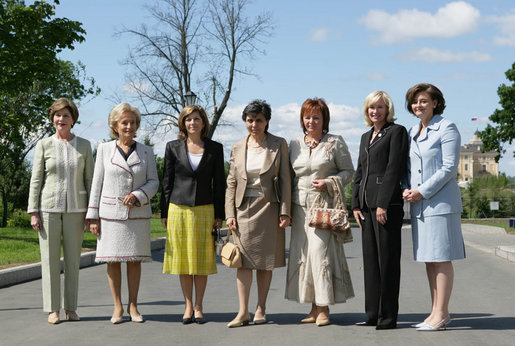
Harper (second from right) at 2006 G8 Summit

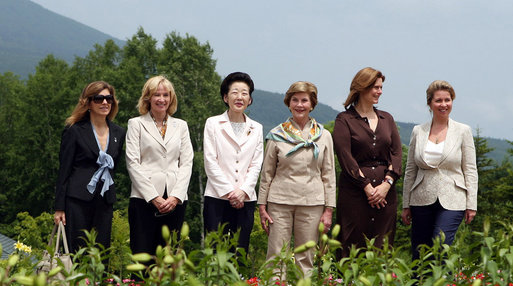
Harper (second from left) at 2008 G8 Summit in Japan

She had an active public life while at 24 Sussex Drive. She supported causes such as the National Arts Centre where she was Honorary Gala Chair starting in 2005. She was also an active supporter and campaigner for animal welfare organizations such as the Ottawa Humane Society. She accompanied her husband on international trips, for example the G8, G20 and others. Mrs. Harper hosted the spouses of G8 and G20 leaders in June 2010 in Toronto, Ontario.

She created some controversy when she notified the National Arts Centre on September 24, 2008, that she would not be able to fulfill her role as Honorary Gala chair on October 4. This announcement came just days after her husband said that rich galas aren't something that resonate with ordinary people. Harper later responded saying that the circumstances of her being unable to attend had nothing to do with his comments.

On June 3, 2013, Harper and Ottawa city councillor Allan Hubley announced a new federal anti-bullying strategy to train approximately 2,400 teenagers across Canada in delivering peer education workshops and presentations against bullying to their fellow students.

== See also ==
- Spouse of the prime minister of Canada
