= Shell Foundation =

British non-profit organization

- Formation: 2000; 26 years ago
- Founder: Shell plc
- Location: London, United Kingdom
- Website: shellfoundation.org

Shell Foundation is a philanthropic foundation. As an independent and registered charity in England and Wales, the Shell Foundation is an initiative of the oil major Shell plc.

In 2000 the Foundation was incorporated as an independent UK-registered charity, with an income stream underpinned by an initial endowment of $250m (£133m) from Shell. The organisation's 10-year objective is focused on enabling tens of millions of people to raise their incomes while lowering emissions through clean energy solutions by 2032, empowering as many women as men through their work in Africa and Asia.

== Activities and charitable approach ==
The Shell Foundation seeks to achieve this objective by fostering innovation and scaling technologies that increase incomes for three core groups of people:

- Smallholder farmers (people who farm on less than 5 acres of land)
- Transporters (people who aspire to drive electric vehicles)
- Micro-entrepreneurs (people who are engaged in the small-scale provision of goods and services)

== Independence ==
Maintaining independence from Shell and other entities is crucial for the Shell Foundation to work across public and private sectors to deliver its charitable objectives. The charitable status information is:

- Registered Charity No. 1080999
- Registered Company No. 4007273

Shell Foundation's charitable status mandates that it exists solely to further its charitable purposes for the public benefit and is governed by its trustees who act exclusively in the interests of the charity, maintaining independence from any other organisation.

== Governance and compliance ==
Shell Foundation is governed by a board of trustees: people from sectors relevant to the organisation's charitable mission, 10 Trustees including a minority of Shell executives (currently 4) and an independent Chairperson. It adheres to business principles, ethics, and compliance, including transparency, non-discrimination, and safeguarding vulnerable adults and children.

== Impact ==
Strategic partnerships amplify the organisation's impact through collaborations with entities like the UK Government's FCDO, FMO Dutch Entrepreneurial Development Bank, British International Investment, and U.S. International Development Finance Corporation.

== Partnerships ==
Shell Foundation collaborates with proven sector leaders in Africa and Asia, co-designing partnerships to scale income-generating energy solutions. Key partnerships include:

- UK Government's Foreign Commonwealth and Development Office (FCDO) through the Transforming Energy Access (TEA) platform and the Catalysing Agriculture by Scaling Energy Ecosystems (CASEE)
- FMO Dutch Entrepreneurial Development Bank
- British International Investment
- U.S. International Development Finance Corporation

The Shell Foundation has a portfolio with aligned organisations They look for innovators, scale partners and finance partners.

== Mobilising catalytic finance ==
Shell Foundation mobilises catalytic finance to seek to relieve poverty and hardship and protect the environment, for the public benefit, through the promotion and development of business-based solutions and supportive market environments, to target large scale impact. The organisation focuses on interventions that address affordability, supply, and distribution of clean energy assets.

== Controversy ==
On 28 September 2006, an article published in The Guardian newspaper alleged that "An attempt by Shell to portray itself as a model of corporate social responsibility was undermined last night after Whitehall documents showed its charitable arm discussing a key commercial project with a British government minister." The article entitled "Campaigners attack Shell’s charity arm over Sakhalin talks" related to The Shell Foundation. The Charity Commission subsequently conducted an inquiry and according to an article published in The Guardian on 17 October 2006, concluded that The Shell Foundation "has fallen short of the good governance and decision-making that we expect from large charities”.
